This is a partial list of unnumbered minor planets for principal provisional designations assigned during 1–31 January 2004. , a total of 531 bodies remain unnumbered for this period. Objects for this year are listed on the following pages: A–B · C · D–E · F · G–H · J–O · P–Q · Ri · Rii · Riii · S · Ti · Tii · Tiii · Tiv · U–V · W–X and Y. Also see previous and next year.

A 

|- id="2004 AC" bgcolor=#FFC2E0
| 2 || 2004 AC || APO || 18.9 || data-sort-value="0.59" | 590 m || multiple || 2004–2020 || 20 Dec 2020 || 147 || align=left | Disc.: LINEAR || 
|- id="2004 AD" bgcolor=#FFC2E0
| 5 || 2004 AD || APO || 24.4 || data-sort-value="0.047" | 47 m || single || 26 days || 30 Jan 2004 || 86 || align=left | Disc.: LONEOS || 
|- id="2004 AM" bgcolor=#FFC2E0
| 7 || 2004 AM || AMO || 19.3 || data-sort-value="0.49" | 490 m || single || 16 days || 28 Jan 2004 || 24 || align=left | Disc.: NEAT || 
|- id="2004 AD1" bgcolor=#FFC2E0
| 1 ||  || APO || 22.5 || data-sort-value="0.11" | 110 m || multiple || 2004–2019 || 30 Aug 2019 || 74 || align=left | Disc.: LONEOS || 
|- id="2004 AY1" bgcolor=#FFC2E0
| 2 ||  || APO || 21.2 || data-sort-value="0.20" | 200 m || multiple || 2004–2017 || 24 Feb 2017 || 61 || align=left | Disc.: LINEAR || 
|- id="2004 AV2" bgcolor=#d6d6d6
| 0 ||  || MBA-O || 17.40 || 1.8 km || multiple || 2004–2021 || 13 Apr 2021 || 68 || align=left | Disc.: VATT || 
|- id="2004 AW2" bgcolor=#FA8072
| 2 ||  || MCA || 17.6 || data-sort-value="0.90" | 900 m || multiple || 2004–2020 || 16 Aug 2020 || 91 || align=left | Disc.: NEAT || 
|- id="2004 AX2" bgcolor=#FA8072
| 2 ||  || MCA || 18.3 || data-sort-value="0.65" | 650 m || multiple || 2004–2017 || 31 Mar 2017 || 153 || align=left | Disc.: NEAT || 
|- id="2004 AX3" bgcolor=#fefefe
| 0 ||  || MBA-I || 18.28 || data-sort-value="0.66" | 660 m || multiple || 2004–2021 || 27 Dec 2021 || 68 || align=left | Disc.: LONEOSAlt.: 2015 ED52 || 
|- id="2004 AE6" bgcolor=#FFC2E0
| 7 ||  || APO || 24.4 || data-sort-value="0.047" | 47 m || single || 17 days || 01 Feb 2004 || 26 || align=left | Disc.: Spacewatch || 
|- id="2004 AL6" bgcolor=#E9E9E9
| 2 ||  || MBA-M || 18.2 || data-sort-value="0.68" | 680 m || multiple || 2004–2019 || 24 Oct 2019 || 31 || align=left | Disc.: Spacewatch || 
|- id="2004 AN6" bgcolor=#fefefe
| 0 ||  || MBA-I || 19.1 || data-sort-value="0.45" | 450 m || multiple || 2002–2021 || 15 Jan 2021 || 66 || align=left | Disc.: Spacewatch || 
|- id="2004 AP6" bgcolor=#d6d6d6
| 0 ||  || MBA-O || 16.70 || 2.5 km || multiple || 2004–2021 || 10 May 2021 || 91 || align=left | Disc.: Spacewatch || 
|- id="2004 AN8" bgcolor=#E9E9E9
| 0 ||  || MBA-M || 18.0 || 1.1 km || multiple || 2001–2021 || 17 Jan 2021 || 66 || align=left | Disc.: Spacewatch || 
|- id="2004 AA9" bgcolor=#E9E9E9
| 0 ||  || MBA-M || 16.78 || 1.9 km || multiple || 2004–2021 || 09 May 2021 || 260 || align=left | Disc.: NEAT || 
|- id="2004 AE9" bgcolor=#FFE699
| 3 ||  || Asteroid || 17.5 || 1.8 km || single || 89 days || 16 Mar 2004 || 81 || align=left | Disc.: LONEOSMBA at MPC || 
|- id="2004 AR10" bgcolor=#fefefe
| 0 ||  || HUN || 18.86 || data-sort-value="0.50" | 500 m || multiple || 2004–2020 || 15 Oct 2020 || 87 || align=left | Disc.: SpacewatchAlt.: 2008 YJ || 
|- id="2004 AL13" bgcolor=#fefefe
| 0 ||  || MBA-I || 18.5 || data-sort-value="0.59" | 590 m || multiple || 2004–2021 || 05 Feb 2021 || 56 || align=left | Disc.: SpacewatchAdded on 11 May 2021Alt.: 2021 AW17 || 
|- id="2004 AR14" bgcolor=#E9E9E9
| 0 ||  || MBA-M || 17.5 || 1.3 km || multiple || 2004–2020 || 18 Dec 2020 || 42 || align=left | Disc.: SpacewatchAdded on 22 July 2020Alt.: 2017 BA43 || 
|- id="2004 AV14" bgcolor=#fefefe
| 0 ||  || MBA-I || 17.9 || data-sort-value="0.78" | 780 m || multiple || 2003–2021 || 04 Jan 2021 || 94 || align=left | Disc.: Spacewatch || 
|- id="2004 AB15" bgcolor=#d6d6d6
| 0 ||  || MBA-O || 15.97 || 3.6 km || multiple || 2003–2021 || 11 May 2021 || 99 || align=left | Disc.: SpacewatchAlt.: 2010 KC131 || 
|- id="2004 AD15" bgcolor=#d6d6d6
| 0 ||  || MBA-O || 17.0 || 2.2 km || multiple || 2003–2020 || 18 Apr 2020 || 104 || align=left | Disc.: SpacewatchAlt.: 2008 YQ72, 2010 GJ107 || 
|- id="2004 AR15" bgcolor=#d6d6d6
| 0 ||  || MBA-O || 16.56 || 2.7 km || multiple || 2003–2021 || 15 May 2021 || 76 || align=left | Disc.: Spacewatch || 
|- id="2004 AV15" bgcolor=#fefefe
| 0 ||  || MBA-I || 18.7 || data-sort-value="0.54" | 540 m || multiple || 2003–2019 || 28 Aug 2019 || 47 || align=left | Disc.: Spacewatch || 
|- id="2004 AC16" bgcolor=#d6d6d6
| 1 ||  || MBA-O || 16.3 || 3.1 km || multiple || 2004–2021 || 17 Jan 2021 || 38 || align=left | Disc.: SpacewatchAdded on 11 May 2021Alt.: 2010 JW12 || 
|- id="2004 AK16" bgcolor=#E9E9E9
| 0 ||  || MBA-M || 17.13 || 1.1 km || multiple || 2000–2021 || 15 Apr 2021 || 115 || align=left | Disc.: SpacewatchAlt.: 2017 FY13 || 
|- id="2004 AP16" bgcolor=#E9E9E9
| 0 ||  || MBA-M || 18.19 || data-sort-value="0.97" | 970 m || multiple || 2004–2022 || 26 Jan 2022 || 50 || align=left | Disc.: SpacewatchAdded on 17 January 2021Alt.: 2007 VX296 || 
|- id="2004 AU16" bgcolor=#E9E9E9
| 0 ||  || MBA-M || 17.56 || 1.3 km || multiple || 2004–2022 || 26 Jan 2022 || 80 || align=left | Disc.: SpacewatchAlt.: 2015 TT163 || 
|- id="2004 AN17" bgcolor=#fefefe
| 0 ||  || MBA-I || 18.43 || data-sort-value="0.61" | 610 m || multiple || 2004–2021 || 07 Jun 2021 || 101 || align=left | Disc.: SpacewatchAlt.: 2014 DK44, 2015 MA63 || 
|- id="2004 AM18" bgcolor=#fefefe
| 0 ||  || MBA-I || 19.01 || data-sort-value="0.47" | 470 m || multiple || 2004–2021 || 15 May 2021 || 53 || align=left | Disc.: Spacewatch || 
|- id="2004 AO18" bgcolor=#fefefe
| 0 ||  || MBA-I || 18.06 || data-sort-value="0.73" | 730 m || multiple || 1996–2021 || 30 Jul 2021 || 160 || align=left | Disc.: Spacewatch || 
|- id="2004 AP18" bgcolor=#d6d6d6
| 0 ||  || MBA-O || 16.8 || 2.4 km || multiple || 2004–2021 || 18 Jan 2021 || 45 || align=left | Disc.: Spacewatch || 
|- id="2004 AV18" bgcolor=#fefefe
| 0 ||  || MBA-I || 18.8 || data-sort-value="0.52" | 520 m || multiple || 2004–2021 || 04 Jan 2021 || 58 || align=left | Disc.: Spacewatch || 
|- id="2004 AX18" bgcolor=#E9E9E9
| 0 ||  || MBA-M || 17.77 || data-sort-value="0.83" | 830 m || multiple || 1996–2021 || 02 May 2021 || 78 || align=left | Disc.: Spacewatch || 
|- id="2004 AF19" bgcolor=#fefefe
| 2 ||  || MBA-I || 18.6 || data-sort-value="0.57" | 570 m || multiple || 2004–2019 || 10 Jan 2019 || 28 || align=left | Disc.: SpacewatchAdded on 22 July 2020 || 
|- id="2004 AH19" bgcolor=#fefefe
| 0 ||  || MBA-I || 18.95 || data-sort-value="0.48" | 480 m || multiple || 2003–2021 || 09 Nov 2021 || 43 || align=left | Disc.: Spacewatch || 
|- id="2004 AY19" bgcolor=#d6d6d6
| 0 ||  || MBA-O || 17.02 || 2.2 km || multiple || 2004–2021 || 29 Sep 2021 || 146 || align=left | Disc.: SpacewatchAlt.: 2008 YG53, 2009 CO66, 2010 MV149 || 
|- id="2004 AZ19" bgcolor=#E9E9E9
| 1 ||  || MBA-M || 18.3 || data-sort-value="0.92" | 920 m || multiple || 2004–2020 || 14 Nov 2020 || 28 || align=left | Disc.: SpacewatchAdded on 9 March 2021 || 
|- id="2004 AC20" bgcolor=#E9E9E9
| 0 ||  || MBA-M || 18.39 || data-sort-value="0.62" | 620 m || multiple || 2003–2021 || 10 Apr 2021 || 97 || align=left | Disc.: SpacewatchAlt.: 2016 AZ83 || 
|- id="2004 AG20" bgcolor=#E9E9E9
| 1 ||  || MBA-M || 17.6 || data-sort-value="0.90" | 900 m || multiple || 2004–2020 || 28 Jan 2020 || 79 || align=left | Disc.: Spacewatch || 
|- id="2004 AK20" bgcolor=#fefefe
| 0 ||  || MBA-I || 17.87 || data-sort-value="0.79" | 790 m || multiple || 2003–2022 || 27 Jan 2022 || 107 || align=left | Disc.: SpacewatchAlt.: 2015 DE124 || 
|- id="2004 AL20" bgcolor=#d6d6d6
| 0 ||  || MBA-O || 17.08 || 2.1 km || multiple || 2004–2021 || 03 May 2021 || 97 || align=left | Disc.: Spacewatch || 
|- id="2004 AO20" bgcolor=#E9E9E9
| 0 ||  || MBA-M || 17.2 || 1.5 km || multiple || 2003–2021 || 07 Jan 2021 || 75 || align=left | Disc.: SpacewatchAlt.: 2014 NS10, 2017 AW6 || 
|- id="2004 AS20" bgcolor=#E9E9E9
| 0 ||  || MBA-M || 17.0 || 2.2 km || multiple || 2001–2020 || 05 Nov 2020 || 124 || align=left | Disc.: SpacewatchAdded on 30 September 2021Alt.: 2009 BX157 || 
|- id="2004 AF21" bgcolor=#fefefe
| 0 ||  || MBA-I || 19.36 || data-sort-value="0.40" | 400 m || multiple || 2004–2021 || 14 Nov 2021 || 38 || align=left | Disc.: SpacewatchAdded on 22 July 2020 || 
|- id="2004 AM21" bgcolor=#d6d6d6
| 0 ||  || MBA-O || 16.36 || 3.0 km || multiple || 2002–2021 || 15 May 2021 || 143 || align=left | Disc.: Spacewatch || 
|- id="2004 AR21" bgcolor=#E9E9E9
| 2 ||  || MBA-M || 17.0 || 1.2 km || multiple || 2004–2019 || 30 Dec 2019 || 72 || align=left | Disc.: SpacewatchAdded on 22 July 2020 || 
|- id="2004 AC22" bgcolor=#fefefe
| 0 ||  || MBA-I || 18.3 || data-sort-value="0.65" | 650 m || multiple || 2004–2021 || 18 Jan 2021 || 99 || align=left | Disc.: Spacewatch || 
|- id="2004 AE22" bgcolor=#d6d6d6
| 0 ||  || MBA-O || 16.4 || 2.9 km || multiple || 2004–2021 || 07 Jun 2021 || 115 || align=left | Disc.: Spacewatch || 
|- id="2004 AQ22" bgcolor=#d6d6d6
| 0 ||  || MBA-O || 16.5 || 2.8 km || multiple || 2002–2021 || 08 Jun 2021 || 114 || align=left | Disc.: NEATAlt.: 2002 RR296, 2008 YG89 || 
|- id="2004 AU22" bgcolor=#E9E9E9
| 0 ||  || MBA-M || 17.16 || 2.1 km || multiple || 2003–2021 || 05 Dec 2021 || 106 || align=left | Disc.: Spacewatch || 
|- id="2004 AZ22" bgcolor=#E9E9E9
| 0 ||  || MBA-M || 17.0 || 1.7 km || multiple || 2004–2021 || 12 Jan 2021 || 78 || align=left | Disc.: Spacewatch || 
|- id="2004 AG23" bgcolor=#fefefe
| 0 ||  || MBA-I || 18.31 || data-sort-value="0.65" | 650 m || multiple || 2001–2021 || 09 May 2021 || 100 || align=left | Disc.: Spacewatch || 
|- id="2004 AJ23" bgcolor=#fefefe
| 0 ||  || MBA-I || 18.61 || data-sort-value="0.56" | 560 m || multiple || 2004–2021 || 02 May 2021 || 64 || align=left | Disc.: Spacewatch || 
|- id="2004 AK23" bgcolor=#d6d6d6
| 0 ||  || MBA-O || 16.64 || 2.6 km || multiple || 1996–2021 || 07 Apr 2021 || 115 || align=left | Disc.: SpacewatchAlt.: 2010 JU198 || 
|- id="2004 AA24" bgcolor=#E9E9E9
| 0 ||  || MBA-M || 17.58 || data-sort-value="0.91" | 910 m || multiple || 2000–2021 || 09 Apr 2021 || 79 || align=left | Disc.: SpacewatchAlt.: 2017 FH74 || 
|- id="2004 AM24" bgcolor=#fefefe
| 1 ||  || MBA-I || 18.6 || data-sort-value="0.57" | 570 m || multiple || 2004–2020 || 17 Dec 2020 || 36 || align=left | Disc.: Spacewatch || 
|- id="2004 AN25" bgcolor=#E9E9E9
| 0 ||  || MBA-M || 16.8 || 1.8 km || multiple || 2003–2020 || 17 Dec 2020 || 136 || align=left | Disc.: NEATAlt.: 2007 TR244 || 
|- id="2004 AL26" bgcolor=#E9E9E9
| 0 ||  || MBA-M || 16.87 || 1.3 km || multiple || 1996–2021 || 16 May 2021 || 332 || align=left | Disc.: NEATAlt.: 2013 LF19 || 
|- id="2004 AB27" bgcolor=#E9E9E9
| 0 ||  || MBA-M || 17.8 || 1.2 km || multiple || 2004–2019 || 26 Sep 2019 || 59 || align=left | Disc.: Spacewatch || 
|- id="2004 AC27" bgcolor=#fefefe
| 0 ||  || MBA-I || 18.78 || data-sort-value="0.52" | 520 m || multiple || 2004–2022 || 27 Jan 2022 || 41 || align=left | Disc.: Spacewatch || 
|- id="2004 AD27" bgcolor=#E9E9E9
| 0 ||  || MBA-M || 17.2 || 1.5 km || multiple || 2004–2020 || 26 Dec 2020 || 196 || align=left | Disc.: Spacewatch || 
|- id="2004 AF27" bgcolor=#fefefe
| 1 ||  || MBA-I || 19.1 || data-sort-value="0.45" | 450 m || multiple || 2004–2019 || 17 Dec 2019 || 37 || align=left | Disc.: Spacewatch || 
|- id="2004 AG27" bgcolor=#fefefe
| 0 ||  || MBA-I || 18.96 || data-sort-value="0.48" | 480 m || multiple || 2004–2021 || 07 Nov 2021 || 54 || align=left | Disc.: Spacewatch || 
|- id="2004 AH27" bgcolor=#E9E9E9
| 0 ||  || MBA-M || 18.06 || data-sort-value="0.73" | 730 m || multiple || 2004–2021 || 10 Apr 2021 || 98 || align=left | Disc.: SpacewatchAlt.: 2019 UQ15 || 
|- id="2004 AJ27" bgcolor=#d6d6d6
| 0 ||  || MBA-O || 16.7 || 2.5 km || multiple || 2004–2021 || 18 Jan 2021 || 69 || align=left | Disc.: Spacewatch || 
|- id="2004 AK27" bgcolor=#d6d6d6
| 0 ||  || MBA-O || 16.6 || 2.7 km || multiple || 2004–2021 || 15 Jan 2021 || 76 || align=left | Disc.: Spacewatch || 
|- id="2004 AL27" bgcolor=#fefefe
| 0 ||  || MBA-I || 18.0 || data-sort-value="0.75" | 750 m || multiple || 2004–2020 || 21 Apr 2020 || 49 || align=left | Disc.: Spacewatch || 
|- id="2004 AM27" bgcolor=#fefefe
| 0 ||  || MBA-I || 18.7 || data-sort-value="0.54" | 540 m || multiple || 2004–2019 || 01 Nov 2019 || 37 || align=left | Disc.: Spacewatch || 
|- id="2004 AO27" bgcolor=#E9E9E9
| 2 ||  || MBA-M || 17.9 || data-sort-value="0.78" | 780 m || multiple || 2004–2020 || 23 Jan 2020 || 50 || align=left | Disc.: Spacewatch || 
|- id="2004 AP27" bgcolor=#E9E9E9
| 0 ||  || MBA-M || 17.90 || 1.1 km || multiple || 2004–2022 || 26 Jan 2022 || 50 || align=left | Disc.: Spacewatch || 
|- id="2004 AQ27" bgcolor=#fefefe
| 0 ||  || MBA-I || 18.7 || data-sort-value="0.54" | 540 m || multiple || 2004–2020 || 23 Jun 2020 || 50 || align=left | Disc.: Spacewatch || 
|- id="2004 AR27" bgcolor=#fefefe
| 1 ||  || MBA-I || 19.0 || data-sort-value="0.47" | 470 m || multiple || 2004–2020 || 13 Sep 2020 || 24 || align=left | Disc.: SpacewatchAdded on 22 July 2020 || 
|}
back to top

B 

|- id="2004 BC" bgcolor=#fefefe
| 1 || 2004 BC || MBA-I || 17.5 || data-sort-value="0.94" | 940 m || multiple || 2003–2021 || 17 Jan 2021 || 46 || align=left | Disc.: NEAT || 
|- id="2004 BJ" bgcolor=#E9E9E9
| 0 || 2004 BJ || MBA-M || 17.44 || data-sort-value="0.97" | 970 m || multiple || 2002–2021 || 15 Apr 2021 || 71 || align=left | Disc.: SpacewatchAdded on 22 July 2020 || 
|- id="2004 BP" bgcolor=#fefefe
| 0 || 2004 BP || MBA-I || 17.9 || data-sort-value="0.78" | 780 m || multiple || 2003–2020 || 17 Oct 2020 || 77 || align=left | Disc.: SpacewatchAdded on 17 January 2021Alt.: 2015 FY244 || 
|- id="2004 BU" bgcolor=#d6d6d6
| 0 || 2004 BU || MBA-O || 17.2 || 2.0 km || multiple || 2004–2021 || 12 Jun 2021 || 109 || align=left | Disc.: Spacewatch || 
|- id="2004 BB1" bgcolor=#d6d6d6
| 1 ||  || MBA-O || 17.9 || 1.5 km || multiple || 2004–2020 || 02 Feb 2020 || 41 || align=left | Disc.: SpacewatchAdded on 22 July 2020 || 
|- id="2004 BF1" bgcolor=#fefefe
| 0 ||  || MBA-I || 18.6 || data-sort-value="0.57" | 570 m || multiple || 1999–2020 || 10 Dec 2020 || 76 || align=left | Disc.: SpacewatchAlt.: 2011 BP91 || 
|- id="2004 BY1" bgcolor=#FFC2E0
| 7 ||  || ATE || 24.5 || data-sort-value="0.045" | 45 m || single || 28 days || 14 Feb 2004 || 37 || align=left | Disc.: AMOS || 
|- id="2004 BM2" bgcolor=#d6d6d6
| 0 ||  || MBA-O || 16.1 || 3.4 km || multiple || 2004–2020 || 28 Apr 2020 || 138 || align=left | Disc.: NEATAlt.: 2015 BS303 || 
|- id="2004 BQ4" bgcolor=#E9E9E9
| 0 ||  || MBA-M || 16.63 || 2.0 km || multiple || 2003–2021 || 31 Mar 2021 || 194 || align=left | Disc.: NEAT || 
|- id="2004 BK6" bgcolor=#fefefe
| 0 ||  || MBA-I || 19.00 || data-sort-value="0.47" | 470 m || multiple || 2004–2022 || 12 Jan 2022 || 73 || align=left | Disc.: SpacewatchAlt.: 2015 BH297 || 
|- id="2004 BZ6" bgcolor=#d6d6d6
| 1 ||  || MBA-O || 17.2 || 2.0 km || multiple || 2004–2019 || 28 Dec 2019 || 41 || align=left | Disc.: SpacewatchAdded on 22 July 2020Alt.: 2015 BX209 || 
|- id="2004 BC7" bgcolor=#E9E9E9
| 0 ||  || MBA-M || 17.52 || 1.7 km || multiple || 2004–2022 || 06 Jan 2022 || 104 || align=left | Disc.: SpacewatchAlt.: 2007 RD185 || 
|- id="2004 BF7" bgcolor=#E9E9E9
| 0 ||  || MBA-M || 17.7 || 1.2 km || multiple || 2004–2021 || 07 Feb 2021 || 31 || align=left | Disc.: SpacewatchAdded on 9 March 2021 || 
|- id="2004 BK7" bgcolor=#E9E9E9
| – ||  || MBA-M || 19.6 || data-sort-value="0.36" | 360 m || single || 2 days || 18 Jan 2004 || 9 || align=left | Disc.: Spacewatch || 
|- id="2004 BO7" bgcolor=#fefefe
| 0 ||  || MBA-I || 18.4 || data-sort-value="0.62" | 620 m || multiple || 2004–2020 || 23 May 2020 || 77 || align=left | Disc.: Spacewatch || 
|- id="2004 BP7" bgcolor=#fefefe
| 0 ||  || MBA-I || 18.9 || data-sort-value="0.49" | 490 m || multiple || 2004–2019 || 28 Nov 2019 || 52 || align=left | Disc.: SpacewatchAlt.: 2016 XF11 || 
|- id="2004 BY7" bgcolor=#E9E9E9
| 0 ||  || MBA-M || 17.3 || 1.5 km || multiple || 2003–2021 || 12 Jan 2021 || 146 || align=left | Disc.: Spacewatch || 
|- id="2004 BA8" bgcolor=#E9E9E9
| 0 ||  || MBA-M || 17.28 || 1.9 km || multiple || 2003–2021 || 27 Nov 2021 || 75 || align=left | Disc.: Spacewatch || 
|- id="2004 BF8" bgcolor=#E9E9E9
| 0 ||  || MBA-M || 17.4 || 1.4 km || multiple || 1998–2021 || 16 Jan 2021 || 122 || align=left | Disc.: Spacewatch || 
|- id="2004 BN10" bgcolor=#FA8072
| 0 ||  || MCA || 17.93 || 1.7 km || multiple || 2004–2021 || 08 Sep 2021 || 122 || align=left | Disc.: Spacewatch || 
|- id="2004 BP10" bgcolor=#E9E9E9
| 0 ||  || MBA-M || 17.44 || data-sort-value="0.97" | 970 m || multiple || 2004–2021 || 15 May 2021 || 154 || align=left | Disc.: AMOSAlt.: 2015 XN231, 2017 HJ39 || 
|- id="2004 BD11" bgcolor=#FA8072
| – ||  || MCA || 21.2 || data-sort-value="0.17" | 170 m || single || 2 days || 19 Jan 2004 || 18 || align=left | Disc.: Spacewatch || 
|- id="2004 BF11" bgcolor=#FFC2E0
| 6 ||  || AMO || 24.0 || data-sort-value="0.056" | 56 m || single || 35 days || 22 Feb 2004 || 37 || align=left | Disc.: Spacewatch || 
|- id="2004 BH11" bgcolor=#FFC2E0
| 8 ||  || APO || 24.1 || data-sort-value="0.054" | 54 m || single || 10 days || 28 Jan 2004 || 21 || align=left | Disc.: Spacewatch || 
|- id="2004 BJ11" bgcolor=#FFC2E0
| 5 ||  || AMO || 21.7 || data-sort-value="0.16" | 160 m || multiple || 2004–2011 || 02 Feb 2011 || 21 || align=left | Disc.: Spacewatch || 
|- id="2004 BK11" bgcolor=#FFC2E0
| 5 ||  || AMO || 22.4 || data-sort-value="0.12" | 120 m || single || 29 days || 16 Feb 2004 || 31 || align=left | Disc.: Spacewatch || 
|- id="2004 BM11" bgcolor=#FFC2E0
| 2 ||  || APO || 21.8 || data-sort-value="0.16" | 160 m || multiple || 2004–2016 || 30 Aug 2016 || 44 || align=left | Disc.: NEATAlt.: 2016 QP11 || 
|- id="2004 BX11" bgcolor=#d6d6d6
| 0 ||  || MBA-O || 15.77 || 3.9 km || multiple || 2004–2021 || 09 Apr 2021 || 172 || align=left | Disc.: NEATAlt.: 2015 AF144 || 
|- id="2004 BK13" bgcolor=#E9E9E9
| 0 ||  || MBA-M || 16.85 || 1.8 km || multiple || 2004–2021 || 08 May 2021 || 273 || align=left | Disc.: NEAT || 
|- id="2004 BV13" bgcolor=#E9E9E9
| 1 ||  || MBA-M || 17.4 || data-sort-value="0.98" | 980 m || multiple || 2004–2020 || 26 Jan 2020 || 241 || align=left | Disc.: NEAT || 
|- id="2004 BU15" bgcolor=#d6d6d6
| 0 ||  || MBA-O || 16.20 || 3.2 km || multiple || 2003–2021 || 09 May 2021 || 254 || align=left | Disc.: NEATAlt.: 2014 WK425 || 
|- id="2004 BE16" bgcolor=#E9E9E9
| 0 ||  || MBA-M || 16.7 || 1.9 km || multiple || 2004–2021 || 03 Jan 2021 || 248 || align=left | Disc.: NEAT || 
|- id="2004 BU16" bgcolor=#E9E9E9
| 0 ||  || MBA-M || 16.6 || 2.0 km || multiple || 2003–2021 || 05 Jan 2021 || 95 || align=left | Disc.: NEAT || 
|- id="2004 BJ17" bgcolor=#fefefe
| 1 ||  || HUN || 17.8 || data-sort-value="0.82" | 820 m || multiple || 2004–2020 || 11 Apr 2020 || 176 || align=left | Disc.: NEATAlt.: 2012 CZ18 || 
|- id="2004 BP18" bgcolor=#d6d6d6
| 0 ||  || MBA-O || 16.62 || 2.6 km || multiple || 2004–2021 || 10 Apr 2021 || 114 || align=left | Disc.: SpacewatchAlt.: 2015 AY229, 2018 VR35 || 
|- id="2004 BR18" bgcolor=#fefefe
| 0 ||  || MBA-I || 18.94 || data-sort-value="0.48" | 480 m || multiple || 2004–2021 || 27 Nov 2021 || 63 || align=left | Disc.: SpacewatchAdded on 5 November 2021 || 
|- id="2004 BV18" bgcolor=#FFC2E0
| 5 ||  || APO || 25.9 || data-sort-value="0.023" | 23 m || single || 30 days || 18 Feb 2004 || 96 || align=left | Disc.: Spacewatch || 
|- id="2004 BW18" bgcolor=#FFC2E0
| 4 ||  || AMO || 22.5 || data-sort-value="0.11" | 110 m || single || 105 days || 13 Apr 2004 || 93 || align=left | Disc.: LINEAR || 
|- id="2004 BZ18" bgcolor=#FFC2E0
| 6 ||  || AMO || 21.2 || data-sort-value="0.20" | 200 m || single || 27 days || 15 Feb 2004 || 30 || align=left | Disc.: LINEAR || 
|- id="2004 BY21" bgcolor=#FFC2E0
| 1 ||  || AMO || 18.8 || data-sort-value="0.62" | 620 m || multiple || 2004–2019 || 15 Jan 2019 || 50 || align=left | Disc.: LINEAR || 
|- id="2004 BD22" bgcolor=#FA8072
| 1 ||  || MCA || 17.8 || data-sort-value="0.82" | 820 m || multiple || 2004–2019 || 24 Aug 2019 || 70 || align=left | Disc.: NEATAlt.: 2015 OF47 || 
|- id="2004 BF23" bgcolor=#d6d6d6
| 0 ||  || MBA-O || 15.5 || 4.4 km || multiple || 2003–2021 || 15 Jan 2021 || 177 || align=left | Disc.: George Obs.Alt.: 2010 CH71 || 
|- id="2004 BK24" bgcolor=#E9E9E9
| 0 ||  || MBA-M || 16.7 || 1.9 km || multiple || 2002–2021 || 19 Jan 2021 || 191 || align=left | Disc.: LONEOS || 
|- id="2004 BG25" bgcolor=#E9E9E9
| 3 ||  || MBA-M || 17.6 || 1.3 km || multiple || 2004–2020 || 09 Dec 2020 || 56 || align=left | Disc.: CSS || 
|- id="2004 BC26" bgcolor=#fefefe
| 0 ||  || MBA-I || 17.2 || 1.1 km || multiple || 2004–2020 || 26 May 2020 || 134 || align=left | Disc.: George Obs. || 
|- id="2004 BT28" bgcolor=#E9E9E9
| 0 ||  || MBA-M || 17.8 || 1.2 km || multiple || 2004–2021 || 17 Jan 2021 || 51 || align=left | Disc.: Spacewatch || 
|- id="2004 BW30" bgcolor=#E9E9E9
| 0 ||  || MBA-M || 16.89 || 1.8 km || multiple || 2004–2021 || 06 May 2021 || 160 || align=left | Disc.: NEATAlt.: 2014 OT376, 2015 XO352 || 
|- id="2004 BV31" bgcolor=#E9E9E9
| 0 ||  || MBA-M || 17.11 || 1.1 km || multiple || 1996–2021 || 11 Jun 2021 || 176 || align=left | Disc.: LONEOSAlt.: 2015 XW188 || 
|- id="2004 BH32" bgcolor=#fefefe
| 0 ||  || MBA-I || 18.0 || data-sort-value="0.75" | 750 m || multiple || 2003–2021 || 24 Jan 2021 || 66 || align=left | Disc.: SpacewatchAlt.: 2015 MS105 || 
|- id="2004 BO33" bgcolor=#d6d6d6
| 0 ||  || MBA-O || 16.8 || 2.4 km || multiple || 2003–2020 || 15 Apr 2020 || 58 || align=left | Disc.: Spacewatch || 
|- id="2004 BR35" bgcolor=#E9E9E9
| 0 ||  || MBA-M || 17.24 || 1.1 km || multiple || 2004–2021 || 07 May 2021 || 181 || align=left | Disc.: SpacewatchAlt.: 2017 FX135 || 
|- id="2004 BQ38" bgcolor=#fefefe
| 0 ||  || MBA-I || 18.2 || data-sort-value="0.68" | 680 m || multiple || 2004–2020 || 22 Sep 2020 || 94 || align=left | Disc.: LINEARAlt.: 2010 XU46 || 
|- id="2004 BT38" bgcolor=#FA8072
| 0 ||  || MCA || 18.82 || data-sort-value="0.51" | 510 m || multiple || 2004–2022 || 27 Jan 2022 || 58 || align=left | Disc.: LINEARAlt.: 2015 DZ220 || 
|- id="2004 BG40" bgcolor=#d6d6d6
| 0 ||  || MBA-O || 16.3 || 3.1 km || multiple || 2004–2020 || 16 Feb 2020 || 169 || align=left | Disc.: LINEARAlt.: 2015 BF77 || 
|- id="2004 BQ40" bgcolor=#fefefe
| 0 ||  || MBA-I || 17.83 || data-sort-value="0.81" | 810 m || multiple || 2003–2021 || 06 Nov 2021 || 130 || align=left | Disc.: LINEAR || 
|- id="2004 BZ40" bgcolor=#fefefe
| 2 ||  || MBA-I || 18.1 || data-sort-value="0.71" | 710 m || multiple || 2004–2020 || 05 Nov 2020 || 72 || align=left | Disc.: LINEAR || 
|- id="2004 BG41" bgcolor=#FFC2E0
| 0 ||  || APO || 24.4 || data-sort-value="0.047" | 47 m || multiple || 2004–2015 || 02 Nov 2015 || 84 || align=left | Disc.: LINEARAlt.: 2008 AA31 || 
|- id="2004 BL41" bgcolor=#E9E9E9
| E ||  || MBA-M || 19.1 || data-sort-value="0.64" | 640 m || single || 3 days || 26 Jan 2004 || 16 || align=left | Disc.: Sierra Nevada Obs. || 
|- id="2004 BN41" bgcolor=#FFC2E0
| 8 ||  || APO || 26.1 || data-sort-value="0.021" | 21 m || single || 7 days || 30 Jan 2004 || 23 || align=left | Disc.: LINEAR || 
|- id="2004 BF45" bgcolor=#FA8072
| 3 ||  || MCA || 17.6 || data-sort-value="0.90" | 900 m || multiple || 2004–2015 || 13 Aug 2015 || 37 || align=left | Disc.: LINEAR || 
|- id="2004 BC49" bgcolor=#d6d6d6
| – ||  || MBA-O || 17.3 || 1.9 km || single || 12 days || 27 Jan 2004 || 12 || align=left | Disc.: LINEAR || 
|- id="2004 BU51" bgcolor=#fefefe
| 1 ||  || MBA-I || 17.3 || 1.0 km || multiple || 2004–2020 || 15 Oct 2020 || 124 || align=left | Disc.: LINEAR || 
|- id="2004 BJ53" bgcolor=#E9E9E9
| 0 ||  || MBA-M || 16.4 || 2.2 km || multiple || 2002–2021 || 18 Jan 2021 || 156 || align=left | Disc.: LINEAR || 
|- id="2004 BP53" bgcolor=#FA8072
| 3 ||  || MCA || 18.9 || data-sort-value="0.70" | 700 m || multiple || 2004–2021 || 10 Feb 2021 || 47 || align=left | Disc.: LINEARAdded on 9 March 2021 || 
|- id="2004 BL57" bgcolor=#E9E9E9
| 1 ||  || MBA-M || 17.9 || 1.1 km || multiple || 2003–2020 || 17 Nov 2020 || 38 || align=left | Disc.: LINEARAlt.: 2013 FC13 || 
|- id="2004 BR58" bgcolor=#E9E9E9
| 1 ||  || MBA-M || 18.0 || 1.1 km || multiple || 2004–2021 || 11 Jan 2021 || 81 || align=left | Disc.: Sandlot Obs.Alt.: 2017 BV132 || 
|- id="2004 BT58" bgcolor=#FFC2E0
| 2 ||  || ATE || 22.2 || data-sort-value="0.13" | 130 m || multiple || 2004–2020 || 25 Jan 2020 || 132 || align=left | Disc.: LINEAR || 
|- id="2004 BX58" bgcolor=#FFC2E0
| 1 ||  || AMO || 19.57 || data-sort-value="0.41" | 450 m || multiple || 2004-2022 || 04 Dec 2022 || 61 || align=left | Disc.: LINEAR || 
|- id="2004 BZ62" bgcolor=#E9E9E9
| 3 ||  || MBA-M || 16.8 || 1.3 km || multiple || 2004–2020 || 18 Jan 2020 || 35 || align=left | Disc.: LINEARAlt.: 2008 CX89 || 
|- id="2004 BZ63" bgcolor=#fefefe
| 0 ||  || MBA-I || 18.6 || data-sort-value="0.57" | 570 m || multiple || 2004–2020 || 04 Jan 2020 || 60 || align=left | Disc.: LINEARAlt.: 2017 DT14 || 
|- id="2004 BH64" bgcolor=#d6d6d6
| 0 ||  || MBA-O || 17.0 || 2.2 km || multiple || 2004–2021 || 09 Jun 2021 || 52 || align=left | Disc.: LINEAR || 
|- id="2004 BM64" bgcolor=#d6d6d6
| 0 ||  || MBA-O || 16.3 || 3.1 km || multiple || 2004–2021 || 23 Jan 2021 || 107 || align=left | Disc.: LINEAR || 
|- id="2004 BP64" bgcolor=#fefefe
| 0 ||  || MBA-I || 18.13 || data-sort-value="0.70" | 700 m || multiple || 2004–2022 || 26 Jan 2022 || 88 || align=left | Disc.: LINEARAdded on 19 October 2020 || 
|- id="2004 BX64" bgcolor=#fefefe
| 0 ||  || MBA-I || 18.40 || data-sort-value="0.62" | 620 m || multiple || 2003–2021 || 14 May 2021 || 115 || align=left | Disc.: LINEAR || 
|- id="2004 BH65" bgcolor=#d6d6d6
| 1 ||  || MBA-O || 17.7 || 1.6 km || multiple || 2003–2020 || 03 Feb 2020 || 30 || align=left | Disc.: LINEARAdded on 22 July 2020 || 
|- id="2004 BJ65" bgcolor=#E9E9E9
| 0 ||  || MBA-M || 17.97 || data-sort-value="0.76" | 760 m || multiple || 2003–2021 || 12 May 2021 || 93 || align=left | Disc.: LINEARAlt.: 2015 XU22 || 
|- id="2004 BL65" bgcolor=#E9E9E9
| 1 ||  || MBA-M || 16.7 || 1.4 km || multiple || 1996–2021 || 06 Jun 2021 || 76 || align=left | Disc.: LINEARAdded on 22 July 2020Alt.: 2007 YS26 || 
|- id="2004 BT65" bgcolor=#fefefe
| 0 ||  || MBA-I || 18.5 || data-sort-value="0.59" | 590 m || multiple || 2004–2021 || 15 Jan 2021 || 100 || align=left | Disc.: LINEARAdded on 17 January 2021 || 
|- id="2004 BQ66" bgcolor=#E9E9E9
| 0 ||  || MBA-M || 17.7 || 1.2 km || multiple || 2004–2021 || 18 Jan 2021 || 64 || align=left | Disc.: LINEARAdded on 22 July 2020Alt.: 2013 GJ65 || 
|- id="2004 BV66" bgcolor=#E9E9E9
| 0 ||  || MBA-M || 17.95 || data-sort-value="0.76" | 760 m || multiple || 2004–2021 || 19 May 2021 || 78 || align=left | Disc.: LINEAR || 
|- id="2004 BM68" bgcolor=#d6d6d6
| 1 ||  || MBA-O || 16.4 || 2.8 km || multiple || 2003–2020 || 23 Feb 2020 || 105 || align=left | Disc.: NEAT || 
|- id="2004 BP68" bgcolor=#fefefe
| 2 ||  || HUN || 18.6 || data-sort-value="0.57" | 570 m || multiple || 2004–2020 || 24 Mar 2020 || 43 || align=left | Disc.: LINEAR || 
|- id="2004 BC69" bgcolor=#FA8072
| – ||  || MCA || 19.6 || data-sort-value="0.36" | 360 m || single || 26 days || 14 Feb 2004 || 18 || align=left | Disc.: Spacewatch || 
|- id="2004 BR69" bgcolor=#fefefe
| 2 ||  || HUN || 18.7 || data-sort-value="0.54" | 540 m || multiple || 2004–2021 || 16 Jan 2021 || 23 || align=left | Disc.: SpacewatchAdded on 11 May 2021 || 
|- id="2004 BA70" bgcolor=#d6d6d6
| 0 ||  || MBA-O || 16.5 || 2.8 km || multiple || 2003–2021 || 01 Jun 2021 || 140 || align=left | Disc.: LINEARAlt.: 2015 AF50 || 
|- id="2004 BQ73" bgcolor=#E9E9E9
| 0 ||  || MBA-M || 17.84 || data-sort-value="0.80" | 800 m || multiple || 2004–2021 || 03 May 2021 || 79 || align=left | Disc.: LINEAR || 
|- id="2004 BZ74" bgcolor=#FFC2E0
| 0 ||  || APO || 18.1 || data-sort-value="0.962" | 962 m || multiple || 2004–2020 || 05 Feb 2020 || 165 || align=left | Disc.: LINEARNEO larger than 1 kilometer || 
|- id="2004 BA75" bgcolor=#FFC2E0
| – ||  || APO || 24.4 || data-sort-value="0.047" | 47 m || single || 4 days || 31 Jan 2004 || 14 || align=left | Disc.: Spacewatch || 
|- id="2004 BB75" bgcolor=#FFC2E0
| 7 ||  || AMO || 23.1 || data-sort-value="0.085" | 85 m || single || 21 days || 18 Feb 2004 || 41 || align=left | Disc.: LINEAR || 
|- id="2004 BP75" bgcolor=#E9E9E9
| 0 ||  || MBA-M || 15.9 || 2.8 km || multiple || 2004–2020 || 17 Dec 2020 || 155 || align=left | Disc.: LONEOSAlt.: 2011 VC21 || 
|- id="2004 BS75" bgcolor=#E9E9E9
| 2 ||  || MBA-M || 17.4 || data-sort-value="0.98" | 980 m || multiple || 2004–2020 || 31 Jan 2020 || 66 || align=left | Disc.: LINEAR || 
|- id="2004 BN77" bgcolor=#E9E9E9
| 3 ||  || MBA-M || 18.3 || data-sort-value="0.65" | 650 m || multiple || 2004–2019 || 18 Nov 2019 || 44 || align=left | Disc.: LINEAR || 
|- id="2004 BU77" bgcolor=#E9E9E9
| 3 ||  || MBA-M || 17.7 || 1.2 km || multiple || 2004–2020 || 19 Dec 2020 || 42 || align=left | Disc.: LINEAR || 
|- id="2004 BW78" bgcolor=#fefefe
| 0 ||  || MBA-I || 18.1 || data-sort-value="0.71" | 710 m || multiple || 2004–2021 || 18 Jan 2021 || 95 || align=left | Disc.: LINEARAlt.: 2013 WO20 || 
|- id="2004 BB82" bgcolor=#d6d6d6
| 0 ||  || MBA-O || 16.24 || 3.1 km || multiple || 2004–2021 || 18 May 2021 || 135 || align=left | Disc.: SpacewatchAlt.: 2010 KO139, 2015 DH177 || 
|- id="2004 BF85" bgcolor=#FFC2E0
| 5 ||  || APO || 20.2 || data-sort-value="0.32" | 320 m || single || 34 days || 09 Feb 2004 || 51 || align=left | Disc.: LINEAR || 
|- id="2004 BV85" bgcolor=#fefefe
| – ||  || MBA-I || 17.4 || data-sort-value="0.98" | 980 m || single || 2 days || 30 Jan 2004 || 11 || align=left | Disc.: LINEAR || 
|- id="2004 BD86" bgcolor=#E9E9E9
| 0 ||  || MBA-M || 17.23 || 1.1 km || multiple || 2004–2021 || 17 May 2021 || 73 || align=left | Disc.: LINEAR || 
|- id="2004 BE86" bgcolor=#FFC2E0
| 0 ||  || AMO || 21.09 || data-sort-value="0.23" | 200 m || multiple || 2003–2023 || 08 Mar 2023 || 397 || align=left | Disc.: LINEAR || 
|- id="2004 BK86" bgcolor=#FFC2E0
| 8 ||  || APO || 25.4 || data-sort-value="0.030" | 30 m || single || 1 day || 31 Jan 2004 || 8 || align=left | Disc.: LINEAR || 
|- id="2004 BM86" bgcolor=#E9E9E9
| 0 ||  || MBA-M || 17.39 || 1.9 km || multiple || 2000–2021 || 30 Nov 2021 || 150 || align=left | Disc.: Spacewatch || 
|- id="2004 BJ91" bgcolor=#E9E9E9
| 0 ||  || MBA-M || 16.34 || 3.0 km || multiple || 2002–2022 || 27 Jan 2022 || 234 || align=left | Disc.: LINEARAlt.: 2013 AA17 || 
|- id="2004 BR92" bgcolor=#E9E9E9
| 0 ||  || MBA-M || 17.73 || 1.2 km || multiple || 2004–2021 || 08 May 2021 || 93 || align=left | Disc.: LONEOSAlt.: 2007 TC391 || 
|- id="2004 BW94" bgcolor=#E9E9E9
| 0 ||  || MBA-M || 15.9 || 2.8 km || multiple || 2004–2021 || 12 Jan 2021 || 350 || align=left | Disc.: LINEARAlt.: 2011 UR256 || 
|- id="2004 BX97" bgcolor=#fefefe
| 0 ||  || MBA-I || 18.22 || data-sort-value="0.67" | 670 m || multiple || 1997–2021 || 08 Apr 2021 || 118 || align=left | Disc.: Spacewatch || 
|- id="2004 BC100" bgcolor=#d6d6d6
| 0 ||  || MBA-O || 17.05 || 2.2 km || multiple || 2004–2021 || 07 Jul 2021 || 76 || align=left | Disc.: SpacewatchAlt.: 2006 OM24, 2018 TM27 || 
|- id="2004 BF100" bgcolor=#d6d6d6
| 0 ||  || MBA-O || 16.1 || 3.4 km || multiple || 2004–2021 || 18 Jan 2021 || 76 || align=left | Disc.: Spacewatch || 
|- id="2004 BL100" bgcolor=#E9E9E9
| – ||  || MBA-M || 18.9 || data-sort-value="0.49" | 490 m || single || 17 days || 14 Feb 2004 || 12 || align=left | Disc.: Spacewatch || 
|- id="2004 BC101" bgcolor=#d6d6d6
| 1 ||  || MBA-O || 17.6 || 1.7 km || multiple || 2004–2020 || 15 Mar 2020 || 40 || align=left | Disc.: SpacewatchAdded on 22 July 2020 || 
|- id="2004 BF101" bgcolor=#E9E9E9
| 0 ||  || MBA-M || 17.78 || data-sort-value="0.83" | 830 m || multiple || 2004–2021 || 09 May 2021 || 59 || align=left | Disc.: SpacewatchAlt.: 2008 AT105 || 
|- id="2004 BJ101" bgcolor=#E9E9E9
| 0 ||  || MBA-M || 18.25 || 1.2 km || multiple || 2004–2022 || 06 Jan 2022 || 45 || align=left | Disc.: SpacewatchAdded on 24 December 2021 || 
|- id="2004 BN101" bgcolor=#fefefe
| 0 ||  || MBA-I || 19.19 || data-sort-value="0.43" | 430 m || multiple || 2004–2022 || 25 Jan 2022 || 38 || align=left | Disc.: Spacewatch || 
|- id="2004 BZ102" bgcolor=#FA8072
| 2 ||  || HUN || 18.4 || data-sort-value="0.62" | 620 m || multiple || 2004–2020 || 12 Jun 2020 || 131 || align=left | Disc.: CSSAlt.: 2012 FH62, 2015 MG11 || 
|- id="2004 BC103" bgcolor=#FA8072
| 0 ||  || MCA || 17.4 || 1.4 km || multiple || 2004–2021 || 16 Jan 2021 || 304 || align=left | Disc.: LINEAR || 
|- id="2004 BH104" bgcolor=#E9E9E9
| 0 ||  || MBA-M || 16.68 || 1.4 km || multiple || 2004–2021 || 08 Aug 2021 || 124 || align=left | Disc.: LINEAR || 
|- id="2004 BC106" bgcolor=#E9E9E9
| 0 ||  || MBA-M || 16.8 || 1.8 km || multiple || 2004–2021 || 18 Jan 2021 || 268 || align=left | Disc.: LONEOSAlt.: 2011 UW36 || 
|- id="2004 BJ112" bgcolor=#fefefe
| 0 ||  || MBA-I || 18.12 || data-sort-value="0.71" | 710 m || multiple || 2003–2021 || 11 Apr 2021 || 118 || align=left | Disc.: SpacewatchAlt.: 2013 YS109 || 
|- id="2004 BN112" bgcolor=#d6d6d6
| 0 ||  || MBA-O || 17.45 || 1.8 km || multiple || 2004–2021 || 08 May 2021 || 50 || align=left | Disc.: SpacewatchAlt.: 2015 BZ172 || 
|- id="2004 BP112" bgcolor=#E9E9E9
| 0 ||  || MBA-M || 17.70 || 1.6 km || multiple || 2003–2021 || 26 Oct 2021 || 45 || align=left | Disc.: Spacewatch || 
|- id="2004 BS112" bgcolor=#E9E9E9
| 0 ||  || MBA-M || 16.85 || 1.8 km || multiple || 2003–2022 || 25 Jan 2022 || 146 || align=left | Disc.: SpacewatchAlt.: 2010 GR52 || 
|- id="2004 BT112" bgcolor=#fefefe
| 0 ||  || MBA-I || 18.3 || data-sort-value="0.65" | 650 m || multiple || 2001–2018 || 13 Aug 2018 || 62 || align=left | Disc.: SpacewatchAlt.: 2012 TM75, 2017 BQ49 || 
|- id="2004 BA118" bgcolor=#E9E9E9
| 0 ||  || MBA-M || 17.26 || 1.0 km || multiple || 2004–2021 || 15 May 2021 || 127 || align=left | Disc.: LINEARAlt.: 2007 YO14 || 
|- id="2004 BM121" bgcolor=#E9E9E9
| 0 ||  || MBA-M || 16.5 || 2.1 km || multiple || 2004–2020 || 18 Dec 2020 || 133 || align=left | Disc.: LINEARAlt.: 2004 DQ38, 2015 TW205, 2017 BZ37 || 
|- id="2004 BT122" bgcolor=#E9E9E9
| – ||  || MBA-M || 19.2 || data-sort-value="0.80" | 800 m || single || 9 days || 30 Jan 2004 || 13 || align=left | Disc.: Mauna Kea Obs. || 
|- id="2004 BU122" bgcolor=#d6d6d6
| – ||  || HIL || 18.6 || 1.1 km || single || 9 days || 30 Jan 2004 || 13 || align=left | Disc.: Mauna Kea Obs. || 
|- id="2004 BJ123" bgcolor=#fefefe
| 0 ||  || MBA-I || 19.53 || data-sort-value="0.37" | 370 m || multiple || 2004–2022 || 25 Jan 2022 || 106 || align=left | Disc.: Mauna Kea Obs.Added on 17 June 2021Alt.: 2020 RL111 || 
|- id="2004 BM123" bgcolor=#E9E9E9
| 0 ||  || MBA-M || 18.24 || data-sort-value="0.67" | 670 m || multiple || 2002–2021 || 13 Apr 2021 || 70 || align=left | Disc.: Mauna Kea Obs.Alt.: 2012 BY118, 2016 AA34 || 
|- id="2004 BN123" bgcolor=#E9E9E9
| 0 ||  || MBA-M || 18.3 || data-sort-value="0.92" | 920 m || multiple || 2004–2018 || 14 Sep 2018 || 44 || align=left | Disc.: Mauna Kea Obs. || 
|- id="2004 BQ123" bgcolor=#E9E9E9
| 0 ||  || MBA-M || 17.75 || 1.2 km || multiple || 2004–2021 || 11 May 2021 || 95 || align=left | Disc.: Mauna Kea Obs. || 
|- id="2004 BR123" bgcolor=#E9E9E9
| 3 ||  || MBA-M || 18.7 || data-sort-value="0.54" | 540 m || multiple || 2004–2021 || 08 May 2021 || 27 || align=left | Disc.: Mauna Kea Obs.Added on 21 August 2021Alt.: 2017 HG79 || 
|- id="2004 BL124" bgcolor=#fefefe
| 0 ||  || MBA-I || 18.1 || data-sort-value="0.71" | 710 m || multiple || 2003–2021 || 18 Jan 2021 || 67 || align=left | Disc.: Spacewatch || 
|- id="2004 BM124" bgcolor=#fefefe
| 0 ||  || MBA-I || 18.6 || data-sort-value="0.57" | 570 m || multiple || 2004–2020 || 20 Oct 2020 || 73 || align=left | Disc.: SpacewatchAlt.: 2015 FR77 || 
|- id="2004 BV124" bgcolor=#d6d6d6
| 0 ||  || MBA-O || 16.5 || 2.8 km || multiple || 2004–2021 || 18 Jan 2021 || 79 || align=left | Disc.: Spacewatch || 
|- id="2004 BX124" bgcolor=#d6d6d6
| 0 ||  || MBA-O || 16.4 || 2.9 km || multiple || 2004–2021 || 07 Jun 2021 || 178 || align=left | Disc.: NEATAlt.: 2015 DS81 || 
|- id="2004 BZ124" bgcolor=#fefefe
| 2 ||  || MBA-I || 19.8 || data-sort-value="0.33" | 330 m || multiple || 2004–2015 || 15 Mar 2015 || 28 || align=left | Disc.: SpacewatchAlt.: 2015 BK507 || 
|- id="2004 BA125" bgcolor=#fefefe
| 0 ||  || MBA-I || 18.55 || data-sort-value="0.58" | 580 m || multiple || 2004–2021 || 30 Nov 2021 || 109 || align=left | Disc.: SpacewatchAlt.: 2010 XG61, 2015 AL41 || 
|- id="2004 BE125" bgcolor=#E9E9E9
| 0 ||  || MBA-M || 17.81 || 1.5 km || multiple || 2004–2021 || 30 Nov 2021 || 80 || align=left | Disc.: SpacewatchAdded on 21 August 2021 || 
|- id="2004 BF125" bgcolor=#fefefe
| 0 ||  || MBA-I || 18.6 || data-sort-value="0.57" | 570 m || multiple || 2004–2021 || 04 Oct 2021 || 50 || align=left | Disc.: Spacewatch || 
|- id="2004 BO125" bgcolor=#fefefe
| 1 ||  || MBA-I || 18.6 || data-sort-value="0.57" | 570 m || multiple || 2004–2020 || 18 Oct 2020 || 135 || align=left | Disc.: Spacewatch || 
|- id="2004 BP125" bgcolor=#fefefe
| 0 ||  || MBA-I || 18.3 || data-sort-value="0.65" | 650 m || multiple || 2004–2020 || 14 Dec 2020 || 126 || align=left | Disc.: SpacewatchAlt.: 2008 GJ63, 2015 KN129 || 
|- id="2004 BR125" bgcolor=#d6d6d6
| 0 ||  || MBA-O || 15.8 || 3.9 km || multiple || 2004–2021 || 18 Jan 2021 || 85 || align=left | Disc.: SpacewatchAlt.: 2010 HK89 || 
|- id="2004 BT125" bgcolor=#d6d6d6
| 0 ||  || MBA-O || 16.48 || 2.8 km || multiple || 2004–2021 || 12 May 2021 || 91 || align=left | Disc.: SpacewatchAlt.: 2012 PO21 || 
|- id="2004 BD126" bgcolor=#fefefe
| 0 ||  || MBA-I || 19.13 || data-sort-value="0.44" | 440 m || multiple || 2004–2021 || 30 Oct 2021 || 64 || align=left | Disc.: SpacewatchAdded on 30 September 2021 || 
|- id="2004 BF126" bgcolor=#fefefe
| 0 ||  || MBA-I || 17.4 || data-sort-value="0.98" | 980 m || multiple || 2004–2020 || 16 Dec 2020 || 125 || align=left | Disc.: SpacewatchAlt.: 2011 BL161 || 
|- id="2004 BQ126" bgcolor=#d6d6d6
| 0 ||  || MBA-O || 16.2 || 3.2 km || multiple || 2004–2021 || 17 Jan 2021 || 90 || align=left | Disc.: Spacewatch || 
|- id="2004 BA127" bgcolor=#E9E9E9
| 0 ||  || MBA-M || 17.37 || 1.9 km || multiple || 2004–2021 || 06 Dec 2021 || 99 || align=left | Disc.: SpacewatchAlt.: 2012 XQ85 || 
|- id="2004 BB127" bgcolor=#fefefe
| 0 ||  || MBA-I || 18.9 || data-sort-value="0.49" | 490 m || multiple || 2004–2020 || 13 Sep 2020 || 52 || align=left | Disc.: SpacewatchAlt.: 2006 SP229 || 
|- id="2004 BQ127" bgcolor=#E9E9E9
| 0 ||  || MBA-M || 18.08 || 1.3 km || multiple || 2004–2021 || 28 Nov 2021 || 74 || align=left | Disc.: SpacewatchAdded on 5 November 2021 || 
|- id="2004 BL128" bgcolor=#fefefe
| 0 ||  || MBA-I || 18.3 || data-sort-value="0.65" | 650 m || multiple || 2004–2020 || 17 Oct 2020 || 93 || align=left | Disc.: Spacewatch || 
|- id="2004 BE129" bgcolor=#E9E9E9
| 0 ||  || MBA-M || 17.2 || 1.5 km || multiple || 2004–2020 || 18 Dec 2020 || 65 || align=left | Disc.: Spacewatch || 
|- id="2004 BJ129" bgcolor=#d6d6d6
| 0 ||  || MBA-O || 16.14 || 3.3 km || multiple || 2004–2021 || 07 Apr 2021 || 139 || align=left | Disc.: SpacewatchAlt.: 2010 KC20, 2015 BA345 || 
|- id="2004 BM129" bgcolor=#d6d6d6
| 0 ||  || MBA-O || 15.96 || 3.6 km || multiple || 2002–2021 || 08 Apr 2021 || 173 || align=left | Disc.: Spacewatch || 
|- id="2004 BZ129" bgcolor=#d6d6d6
| 0 ||  || MBA-O || 16.3 || 3.1 km || multiple || 2004–2021 || 12 Jan 2021 || 87 || align=left | Disc.: SpacewatchAlt.: 2015 AN78 || 
|- id="2004 BC130" bgcolor=#E9E9E9
| 0 ||  || MBA-M || 17.0 || 1.7 km || multiple || 2004–2021 || 19 Jan 2021 || 91 || align=left | Disc.: Spacewatch || 
|- id="2004 BG130" bgcolor=#d6d6d6
| 0 ||  || MBA-O || 16.74 || 2.5 km || multiple || 2001–2021 || 17 Apr 2021 || 134 || align=left | Disc.: SpacewatchAlt.: 2010 LM123, 2015 DX6 || 
|- id="2004 BJ130" bgcolor=#d6d6d6
| 0 ||  || MBA-O || 17.1 || 2.1 km || multiple || 2002–2020 || 16 Mar 2020 || 52 || align=left | Disc.: Spacewatch || 
|- id="2004 BO130" bgcolor=#d6d6d6
| 0 ||  || MBA-O || 16.0 || 3.5 km || multiple || 2004–2021 || 18 Jan 2021 || 127 || align=left | Disc.: SpacewatchAlt.: 2016 CN73 || 
|- id="2004 BA131" bgcolor=#d6d6d6
| 3 ||  || MBA-O || 18.3 || 1.2 km || multiple || 2004–2020 || 02 Feb 2020 || 24 || align=left | Disc.: SpacewatchAdded on 17 January 2021 || 
|- id="2004 BB131" bgcolor=#fefefe
| 0 ||  || MBA-I || 18.1 || data-sort-value="0.71" | 710 m || multiple || 2004–2021 || 12 Jan 2021 || 71 || align=left | Disc.: Spacewatch || 
|- id="2004 BS131" bgcolor=#E9E9E9
| 0 ||  || MBA-M || 16.7 || 1.9 km || multiple || 2001–2021 || 18 Jan 2021 || 133 || align=left | Disc.: SpacewatchAlt.: 2018 LB10 || 
|- id="2004 BV131" bgcolor=#E9E9E9
| 0 ||  || MBA-M || 18.65 || data-sort-value="0.55" | 550 m || multiple || 2004–2021 || 08 May 2021 || 40 || align=left | Disc.: SpacewatchAdded on 22 July 2020 || 
|- id="2004 BL132" bgcolor=#d6d6d6
| 0 ||  || MBA-O || 16.09 || 3.4 km || multiple || 2002–2021 || 12 May 2021 || 225 || align=left | Disc.: NEAT || 
|- id="2004 BO132" bgcolor=#d6d6d6
| 0 ||  || MBA-O || 16.5 || 2.8 km || multiple || 2004–2021 || 13 Jan 2021 || 101 || align=left | Disc.: Spacewatch || 
|- id="2004 BV132" bgcolor=#fefefe
| 0 ||  || MBA-I || 18.0 || data-sort-value="0.75" | 750 m || multiple || 2004–2021 || 10 Jan 2021 || 76 || align=left | Disc.: SpacewatchAlt.: 2015 FK259 || 
|- id="2004 BB133" bgcolor=#fefefe
| 0 ||  || MBA-I || 17.9 || data-sort-value="0.78" | 780 m || multiple || 2004–2021 || 18 Jan 2021 || 70 || align=left | Disc.: Spacewatch || 
|- id="2004 BE133" bgcolor=#E9E9E9
| 0 ||  || MBA-M || 17.41 || data-sort-value="0.98" | 980 m || multiple || 2002–2021 || 14 May 2021 || 130 || align=left | Disc.: SpacewatchAlt.: 2006 SJ170 || 
|- id="2004 BF133" bgcolor=#E9E9E9
| 0 ||  || MBA-M || 17.77 || data-sort-value="0.83" | 830 m || multiple || 1998–2021 || 09 Apr 2021 || 109 || align=left | Disc.: SpacewatchAlt.: 2015 XE219 || 
|- id="2004 BZ133" bgcolor=#d6d6d6
| 3 ||  || MBA-O || 17.8 || 1.5 km || multiple || 2004–2021 || 17 Feb 2021 || 23 || align=left | Disc.: SpacewatchAdded on 17 June 2021 || 
|- id="2004 BC134" bgcolor=#d6d6d6
| 0 ||  || MBA-O || 16.3 || 3.1 km || multiple || 2004–2021 || 13 Feb 2021 || 77 || align=left | Disc.: SpacewatchAdded on 5 November 2021Alt.: 2010 FP15 || 
|- id="2004 BD134" bgcolor=#fefefe
| 0 ||  || MBA-I || 18.7 || data-sort-value="0.54" | 540 m || multiple || 1992–2020 || 13 Sep 2020 || 48 || align=left | Disc.: SpacewatchAdded on 19 October 2020 || 
|- id="2004 BE134" bgcolor=#d6d6d6
| 0 ||  || MBA-O || 17.23 || 2.0 km || multiple || 2004–2021 || 01 Nov 2021 || 116 || align=left | Disc.: Spacewatch || 
|- id="2004 BN134" bgcolor=#d6d6d6
| 0 ||  || MBA-O || 16.4 || 2.9 km || multiple || 2004–2020 || 03 Feb 2020 || 103 || align=left | Disc.: NEAT || 
|- id="2004 BQ134" bgcolor=#E9E9E9
| 0 ||  || MBA-M || 16.4 || 2.2 km || multiple || 2002–2021 || 23 Jan 2021 || 229 || align=left | Disc.: NEAT || 
|- id="2004 BT134" bgcolor=#E9E9E9
| 0 ||  || MBA-M || 17.43 || data-sort-value="0.97" | 970 m || multiple || 2000–2021 || 19 May 2021 || 127 || align=left | Disc.: SpacewatchAlt.: 2013 JL44 || 
|- id="2004 BQ135" bgcolor=#d6d6d6
| 0 ||  || MBA-O || 17.1 || 2.1 km || multiple || 2004–2020 || 22 Mar 2020 || 43 || align=left | Disc.: SpacewatchAdded on 22 July 2020 || 
|- id="2004 BS135" bgcolor=#E9E9E9
| 0 ||  || MBA-M || 17.8 || 1.2 km || multiple || 2004–2020 || 07 Dec 2020 || 45 || align=left | Disc.: Spacewatch || 
|- id="2004 BT135" bgcolor=#E9E9E9
| 0 ||  || MBA-M || 17.7 || 1.2 km || multiple || 2003–2021 || 17 Jan 2021 || 112 || align=left | Disc.: SpacewatchAlt.: 2017 BV35 || 
|- id="2004 BZ135" bgcolor=#d6d6d6
| 0 ||  || MBA-O || 17.30 || 1.9 km || multiple || 2004–2021 || 01 Nov 2021 || 44 || align=left | Disc.: Spacewatch || 
|- id="2004 BB136" bgcolor=#d6d6d6
| 3 ||  || MBA-O || 17.6 || 1.7 km || multiple || 2004–2020 || 14 Feb 2020 || 43 || align=left | Disc.: SpacewatchAdded on 22 July 2020Alt.: 2015 EJ52 || 
|- id="2004 BD136" bgcolor=#E9E9E9
| 0 ||  || MBA-M || 17.6 || 1.3 km || multiple || 2004–2021 || 17 Jan 2021 || 73 || align=left | Disc.: Spacewatch || 
|- id="2004 BO136" bgcolor=#d6d6d6
| 0 ||  || MBA-O || 16.6 || 2.7 km || multiple || 2004–2021 || 17 Jan 2021 || 75 || align=left | Disc.: SpacewatchAlt.: 2010 JZ105 || 
|- id="2004 BV136" bgcolor=#d6d6d6
| 0 ||  || MBA-O || 16.72 || 2.5 km || multiple || 2004–2021 || 17 Apr 2021 || 67 || align=left | Disc.: Spacewatch || 
|- id="2004 BW136" bgcolor=#d6d6d6
| 0 ||  || MBA-O || 16.9 || 2.3 km || multiple || 2004–2021 || 14 Jun 2021 || 78 || align=left | Disc.: SpacewatchAlt.: 2010 FP26 || 
|- id="2004 BH137" bgcolor=#d6d6d6
| 0 ||  || MBA-O || 16.3 || 3.1 km || multiple || 2001–2020 || 12 Apr 2020 || 102 || align=left | Disc.: SpacewatchAlt.: 2010 AV128, 2010 NY7, 2012 TH63 || 
|- id="2004 BN137" bgcolor=#E9E9E9
| 0 ||  || MBA-M || 17.24 || 2.0 km || multiple || 2004–2022 || 27 Jan 2022 || 109 || align=left | Disc.: SpacewatchAdded on 22 July 2020 || 
|- id="2004 BP137" bgcolor=#d6d6d6
| 0 ||  || MBA-O || 16.6 || 2.7 km || multiple || 2004–2021 || 23 Jan 2021 || 61 || align=left | Disc.: SpacewatchAlt.: 2008 WN116 || 
|- id="2004 BY137" bgcolor=#fefefe
| 0 ||  || MBA-I || 19.22 || data-sort-value="0.43" | 430 m || multiple || 2004–2020 || 12 Sep 2020 || 24 || align=left | Disc.: SpacewatchAdded on 21 August 2021 || 
|- id="2004 BQ138" bgcolor=#d6d6d6
| 0 ||  || MBA-O || 17.68 || 1.6 km || multiple || 2004–2021 || 03 Apr 2021 || 25 || align=left | Disc.: Spacewatch || 
|- id="2004 BT138" bgcolor=#fefefe
| 0 ||  || MBA-I || 18.4 || data-sort-value="0.62" | 620 m || multiple || 2004–2019 || 05 Nov 2019 || 65 || align=left | Disc.: SpacewatchAlt.: 2006 WO63 || 
|- id="2004 BE139" bgcolor=#fefefe
| 0 ||  || MBA-I || 18.3 || data-sort-value="0.65" | 650 m || multiple || 2001–2019 || 07 Jul 2019 || 53 || align=left | Disc.: SpacewatchAlt.: 2008 GG28 || 
|- id="2004 BG139" bgcolor=#E9E9E9
| 0 ||  || MBA-M || 18.06 || data-sort-value="0.73" | 730 m || multiple || 2004–2021 || 03 Apr 2021 || 62 || align=left | Disc.: SpacewatchAlt.: 2016 AX87 || 
|- id="2004 BK139" bgcolor=#d6d6d6
| 0 ||  || MBA-O || 17.33 || 1.9 km || multiple || 1999–2021 || 19 May 2021 || 76 || align=left | Disc.: SpacewatchAdded on 9 March 2021Alt.: 2010 MU38, 2020 BF47 || 
|- id="2004 BM139" bgcolor=#fefefe
| 0 ||  || MBA-I || 18.37 || data-sort-value="0.63" | 630 m || multiple || 2002–2021 || 10 May 2021 || 82 || align=left | Disc.: Spacewatch || 
|- id="2004 BN139" bgcolor=#d6d6d6
| 0 ||  || MBA-O || 16.4 || 2.9 km || multiple || 2002–2021 || 15 Apr 2021 || 118 || align=left | Disc.: SpacewatchAdded on 22 July 2020Alt.: 2013 XY39 || 
|- id="2004 BO139" bgcolor=#d6d6d6
| 0 ||  || MBA-O || 17.03 || 2.2 km || multiple || 2004–2021 || 14 Apr 2021 || 75 || align=left | Disc.: SpacewatchAlt.: 2015 BM16 || 
|- id="2004 BP139" bgcolor=#d6d6d6
| 0 ||  || MBA-O || 16.96 || 2.3 km || multiple || 2004–2021 || 05 Feb 2021 || 49 || align=left | Disc.: SpacewatchAdded on 9 March 2021Alt.: 2010 JF209 || 
|- id="2004 BU139" bgcolor=#d6d6d6
| 0 ||  || MBA-O || 16.4 || 2.9 km || multiple || 2004–2021 || 18 Jan 2021 || 48 || align=left | Disc.: SpacewatchAlt.: 2015 BY210 || 
|- id="2004 BD140" bgcolor=#E9E9E9
| 0 ||  || MBA-M || 17.0 || 1.7 km || multiple || 2004–2020 || 10 Dec 2020 || 133 || align=left | Disc.: SpacewatchAlt.: 2011 TE12, 2014 JG37, 2015 NK15 || 
|- id="2004 BR140" bgcolor=#d6d6d6
| 0 ||  || MBA-O || 17.23 || 2.0 km || multiple || 2004–2021 || 03 Apr 2021 || 50 || align=left | Disc.: SpacewatchAlt.: 2005 JH169 || 
|- id="2004 BU140" bgcolor=#d6d6d6
| 0 ||  || MBA-O || 17.0 || 2.2 km || multiple || 2004–2019 || 29 Sep 2019 || 61 || align=left | Disc.: SpacewatchAlt.: 2010 DT114, 2010 JV205 || 
|- id="2004 BX141" bgcolor=#E9E9E9
| 0 ||  || MBA-M || 18.2 || data-sort-value="0.96" | 960 m || multiple || 2004–2021 || 15 Jan 2021 || 42 || align=left | Disc.: Spacewatch || 
|- id="2004 BF142" bgcolor=#d6d6d6
| 0 ||  || MBA-O || 16.4 || 2.9 km || multiple || 1999–2021 || 18 Jan 2021 || 97 || align=left | Disc.: SpacewatchAlt.: 2008 YT111 || 
|- id="2004 BH142" bgcolor=#d6d6d6
| 0 ||  || MBA-O || 16.79 || 2.4 km || multiple || 2000–2021 || 14 May 2021 || 88 || align=left | Disc.: Spacewatch || 
|- id="2004 BT142" bgcolor=#d6d6d6
| 1 ||  || MBA-O || 17.55 || 1.7 km || multiple || 2004–2021 || 17 Apr 2021 || 39 || align=left | Disc.: SpacewatchAlt.: 2015 EB72 || 
|- id="2004 BB143" bgcolor=#fefefe
| 0 ||  || MBA-I || 19.24 || data-sort-value="0.42" | 420 m || multiple || 2004–2021 || 30 Nov 2021 || 49 || align=left | Disc.: SpacewatchAlt.: 2015 AG141 || 
|- id="2004 BE143" bgcolor=#E9E9E9
| 0 ||  || MBA-M || 18.06 || data-sort-value="0.73" | 730 m || multiple || 2004–2021 || 10 May 2021 || 60 || align=left | Disc.: SpacewatchAdded on 11 May 2021Alt.: 2014 SO182, 2021 GJ14 || 
|- id="2004 BN143" bgcolor=#fefefe
| 0 ||  || MBA-I || 18.65 || data-sort-value="0.55" | 550 m || multiple || 2004–2021 || 01 Nov 2021 || 48 || align=left | Disc.: SpacewatchAlt.: 2019 AQ56 || 
|- id="2004 BP143" bgcolor=#d6d6d6
| 0 ||  || MBA-O || 17.4 || 1.8 km || multiple || 2004–2020 || 25 Mar 2020 || 62 || align=left | Disc.: SpacewatchAlt.: 2008 YS88 || 
|- id="2004 BU143" bgcolor=#E9E9E9
| 0 ||  || MBA-M || 17.48 || 1.8 km || multiple || 2004–2021 || 08 Dec 2021 || 103 || align=left | Disc.: Spacewatch || 
|- id="2004 BX143" bgcolor=#d6d6d6
| 0 ||  || MBA-O || 16.2 || 3.2 km || multiple || 2004–2021 || 16 Jan 2021 || 107 || align=left | Disc.: SpacewatchAlt.: 2015 BF224 || 
|- id="2004 BA144" bgcolor=#d6d6d6
| 0 ||  || MBA-O || 16.4 || 2.9 km || multiple || 2004–2021 || 18 Jan 2021 || 73 || align=left | Disc.: SpacewatchAlt.: 2016 EM35 || 
|- id="2004 BR144" bgcolor=#E9E9E9
| 0 ||  || MBA-M || 17.77 || data-sort-value="0.83" | 830 m || multiple || 2004–2021 || 11 Apr 2021 || 114 || align=left | Disc.: SpacewatchAlt.: 2014 OM20 || 
|- id="2004 BD145" bgcolor=#E9E9E9
| 2 ||  || MBA-M || 18.3 || data-sort-value="0.65" | 650 m || multiple || 2004–2020 || 23 Jan 2020 || 59 || align=left | Disc.: SpacewatchAlt.: 2008 BX26, 2012 BT44 || 
|- id="2004 BA148" bgcolor=#E9E9E9
| 0 ||  || MBA-M || 18.2 || data-sort-value="0.96" | 960 m || multiple || 2004–2020 || 16 Aug 2020 || 43 || align=left | Disc.: NEAT || 
|- id="2004 BN148" bgcolor=#E9E9E9
| 0 ||  || MBA-M || 18.02 || data-sort-value="0.74" | 740 m || multiple || 2000–2021 || 09 May 2021 || 59 || align=left | Disc.: SpacewatchAlt.: 2000 AE227 || 
|- id="2004 BP148" bgcolor=#E9E9E9
| 0 ||  || MBA-M || 18.39 || data-sort-value="0.88" | 880 m || multiple || 2004–2020 || 17 Dec 2020 || 57 || align=left | Disc.: SpacewatchAdded on 17 January 2021Alt.: 2007 VE254 || 
|- id="2004 BC153" bgcolor=#E9E9E9
| 0 ||  || MBA-M || 17.5 || 1.3 km || multiple || 2004–2020 || 23 Nov 2020 || 35 || align=left | Disc.: SpacewatchAdded on 17 January 2021 || 
|- id="2004 BH153" bgcolor=#d6d6d6
| 0 ||  || MBA-O || 16.52 || 2.8 km || multiple || 2004–2021 || 09 May 2021 || 60 || align=left | Disc.: Spacewatch || 
|- id="2004 BQ153" bgcolor=#fefefe
| 0 ||  || MBA-I || 18.93 || data-sort-value="0.49" | 490 m || multiple || 2004–2022 || 27 Jan 2022 || 49 || align=left | Disc.: SpacewatchAlt.: 2015 BK435 || 
|- id="2004 BW153" bgcolor=#d6d6d6
| 0 ||  || MBA-O || 16.13 || 3.3 km || multiple || 2004–2021 || 02 Apr 2021 || 197 || align=left | Disc.: SpacewatchAlt.: 2015 BK213 || 
|- id="2004 BG154" bgcolor=#E9E9E9
| 0 ||  || MBA-M || 17.21 || 1.5 km || multiple || 2004–2020 || 10 Dec 2020 || 60 || align=left | Disc.: SpacewatchAdded on 21 August 2021Alt.: 2018 GY19 || 
|- id="2004 BK154" bgcolor=#E9E9E9
| 1 ||  || MBA-M || 18.1 || data-sort-value="0.71" | 710 m || multiple || 2004–2021 || 14 Apr 2021 || 31 || align=left | Disc.: SpacewatchAdded on 21 August 2021Alt.: 2020 YM23 || 
|- id="2004 BT154" bgcolor=#d6d6d6
| 0 ||  || MBA-O || 17.14 || 2.1 km || multiple || 2004–2021 || 16 Apr 2021 || 35 || align=left | Disc.: SpacewatchAdded on 17 June 2021Alt.: 2015 BP252 || 
|- id="2004 BC155" bgcolor=#d6d6d6
| 0 ||  || MBA-O || 16.9 || 2.3 km || multiple || 2004–2021 || 12 Jan 2021 || 58 || align=left | Disc.: SpacewatchAdded on 22 July 2020Alt.: 2015 AR78 || 
|- id="2004 BE155" bgcolor=#E9E9E9
| 0 ||  || MBA-M || 17.05 || 1.2 km || multiple || 2004–2021 || 02 Apr 2021 || 99 || align=left | Disc.: Spacewatch || 
|- id="2004 BQ155" bgcolor=#d6d6d6
| 0 ||  || MBA-O || 16.1 || 3.4 km || multiple || 2004–2021 || 10 Jan 2021 || 96 || align=left | Disc.: Spacewatch || 
|- id="2004 BU155" bgcolor=#fefefe
| 1 ||  || MBA-I || 18.63 || data-sort-value="0.56" | 560 m || multiple || 2004–2021 || 02 Oct 2021 || 114 || align=left | Disc.: Spacewatch || 
|- id="2004 BB156" bgcolor=#d6d6d6
| 0 ||  || MBA-O || 16.56 || 2.7 km || multiple || 2004–2021 || 07 Jul 2021 || 115 || align=left | Disc.: SpacewatchAlt.: 2004 CS9, 2006 OT22 || 
|- id="2004 BD156" bgcolor=#E9E9E9
| 0 ||  || MBA-M || 17.2 || 2.0 km || multiple || 2004–2020 || 22 Sep 2020 || 78 || align=left | Disc.: NEATAlt.: 2009 DZ29, 2015 PY152 || 
|- id="2004 BE156" bgcolor=#d6d6d6
| 0 ||  || MBA-O || 16.6 || 2.7 km || multiple || 2004–2021 || 15 Jan 2021 || 61 || align=left | Disc.: Spacewatch || 
|- id="2004 BR156" bgcolor=#d6d6d6
| 4 ||  || MBA-O || 17.9 || 1.5 km || multiple || 2004–2021 || 15 Mar 2021 || 23 || align=left | Disc.: SpacewatchAdded on 17 June 2021Alt.: 2015 BE172 || 
|- id="2004 BT156" bgcolor=#d6d6d6
| 0 ||  || MBA-O || 16.4 || 2.9 km || multiple || 2004–2021 || 23 Jan 2021 || 92 || align=left | Disc.: SpacewatchAlt.: 2015 AZ50 || 
|- id="2004 BA157" bgcolor=#d6d6d6
| 0 ||  || MBA-O || 16.1 || 3.4 km || multiple || 2004–2021 || 18 Jan 2021 || 152 || align=left | Disc.: SpacewatchAlt.: 2010 KU51 || 
|- id="2004 BD159" bgcolor=#d6d6d6
| 0 ||  || MBA-O || 17.3 || 1.9 km || multiple || 2004–2020 || 25 Mar 2020 || 57 || align=left | Disc.: Paranal Obs.Alt.: 2015 FL114 || 
|- id="2004 BG159" bgcolor=#E9E9E9
| 4 ||  || MBA-M || 18.9 || data-sort-value="0.49" | 490 m || multiple || 2004–2021 || 09 May 2021 || 107 || align=left | Disc.: Cerro ParanalAdded on 17 June 2021Alt.: 2021 GC100 || 
|- id="2004 BK159" bgcolor=#E9E9E9
| E ||  || MBA-M || 18.4 || 1.2 km || single || 2 days || 22 Jan 2004 || 6 || align=left | Disc.: Paranal Obs. || 
|- id="2004 BL159" bgcolor=#d6d6d6
| 0 ||  || MBA-O || 16.97 || 2.2 km || multiple || 2004–2021 || 15 Apr 2021 || 79 || align=left | Disc.: Paranal Obs. || 
|- id="2004 BN159" bgcolor=#fefefe
| 0 ||  || MBA-I || 18.5 || data-sort-value="0.59" | 590 m || multiple || 2004–2020 || 21 Oct 2020 || 41 || align=left | Disc.: Paranal Obs. || 
|- id="2004 BR159" bgcolor=#d6d6d6
| – ||  || MBA-O || 17.3 || 1.9 km || single || 3 days || 23 Jan 2004 || 8 || align=left | Disc.: Paranal Obs. || 
|- id="2004 BS159" bgcolor=#d6d6d6
| 0 ||  || MBA-O || 17.04 || 2.2 km || multiple || 2004–2021 || 15 May 2021 || 45 || align=left | Disc.: Paranal Obs. || 
|- id="2004 BT159" bgcolor=#fefefe
| 0 ||  || MBA-I || 18.9 || data-sort-value="0.49" | 490 m || multiple || 2004–2020 || 22 Mar 2020 || 60 || align=left | Disc.: Paranal Obs. || 
|- id="2004 BU159" bgcolor=#E9E9E9
| 0 ||  || MBA-M || 17.9 || 1.1 km || multiple || 2004–2021 || 17 Jan 2021 || 63 || align=left | Disc.: Paranal Obs. || 
|- id="2004 BV159" bgcolor=#E9E9E9
| – ||  || MBA-M || 18.5 || data-sort-value="0.84" | 840 m || single || 2 days || 22 Jan 2004 || 9 || align=left | Disc.: Paranal Obs. || 
|- id="2004 BW159" bgcolor=#E9E9E9
| 0 ||  || MBA-M || 17.8 || 1.5 km || multiple || 2004–2020 || 11 Dec 2020 || 53 || align=left | Disc.: Paranal Obs. || 
|- id="2004 BX159" bgcolor=#E9E9E9
| 0 ||  || MBA-M || 17.10 || 1.1 km || multiple || 1997–2021 || 26 Oct 2021 || 139 || align=left | Disc.: Paranal Obs. || 
|- id="2004 BB160" bgcolor=#d6d6d6
| 3 ||  || MBA-O || 17.7 || 1.6 km || multiple || 2004–2017 || 21 Sep 2017 || 36 || align=left | Disc.: Paranal Obs.Added on 11 May 2021Alt.: 2006 SL104 || 
|- id="2004 BD160" bgcolor=#d6d6d6
| 0 ||  || MBA-O || 17.36 || 1.9 km || multiple || 2004–2021 || 29 Apr 2021 || 67 || align=left | Disc.: Paranal Obs.Alt.: 2010 PZ29, 2015 FK46 || 
|- id="2004 BG160" bgcolor=#E9E9E9
| 0 ||  || MBA-M || 17.8 || 1.5 km || multiple || 2004–2021 || 06 Jan 2021 || 95 || align=left | Disc.: Paranal Obs. || 
|- id="2004 BL160" bgcolor=#d6d6d6
| 0 ||  || MBA-O || 17.94 || 1.4 km || multiple || 2004–2021 || 11 Nov 2021 || 64 || align=left | Disc.: Paranal Obs. || 
|- id="2004 BM160" bgcolor=#d6d6d6
| 0 ||  || MBA-O || 17.2 || 2.0 km || multiple || 2004–2021 || 01 Jul 2021 || 35 || align=left | Disc.: Paranal Obs.Added on 21 August 2021Alt.: 2017 PG9 || 
|- id="2004 BR160" bgcolor=#fefefe
| 0 ||  || MBA-I || 19.37 || data-sort-value="0.40" | 400 m || multiple || 2004–2022 || 07 Jan 2022 || 32 || align=left | Disc.: Paranal Obs. || 
|- id="2004 BO162" bgcolor=#d6d6d6
| 0 ||  || MBA-O || 17.6 || 1.7 km || multiple || 2004–2018 || 30 Dec 2018 || 40 || align=left | Disc.: Mauna Kea Obs.Added on 21 August 2021Alt.: 2007 TY47 || 
|- id="2004 BR163" bgcolor=#E9E9E9
| 0 ||  || MBA-M || 18.2 || data-sort-value="0.96" | 960 m || multiple || 2004–2021 || 09 Jan 2021 || 53 || align=left | Disc.: SpacewatchAdded on 9 March 2021Alt.: 2011 UW470 || 
|- id="2004 BS163" bgcolor=#fefefe
| 2 ||  || MBA-I || 18.5 || data-sort-value="0.59" | 590 m || multiple || 2003–2020 || 21 Apr 2020 || 72 || align=left | Disc.: Spacewatch || 
|- id="2004 BA164" bgcolor=#d6d6d6
| 0 ||  || MBA-O || 18.25 || 1.2 km || multiple || 2004–2021 || 07 Nov 2021 || 38 || align=left | Disc.: Mauna Kea Obs.Added on 9 March 2021Alt.: 2006 SC383 || 
|- id="2004 BB164" bgcolor=#d6d6d6
| 0 ||  || MBA-O || 16.7 || 2.5 km || multiple || 2004–2020 || 21 Mar 2020 || 67 || align=left | Disc.: Spacewatch || 
|- id="2004 BC164" bgcolor=#fefefe
| 0 ||  || MBA-I || 17.7 || data-sort-value="0.86" | 860 m || multiple || 2003–2021 || 19 Jan 2021 || 86 || align=left | Disc.: NEAT || 
|- id="2004 BE164" bgcolor=#E9E9E9
| 0 ||  || MBA-M || 17.7 || 1.2 km || multiple || 2004–2020 || 18 Dec 2020 || 39 || align=left | Disc.: NEAT || 
|- id="2004 BF164" bgcolor=#fefefe
| 0 ||  || MBA-I || 18.1 || data-sort-value="0.71" | 710 m || multiple || 2001–2020 || 19 Nov 2020 || 80 || align=left | Disc.: Spacewatch || 
|- id="2004 BJ164" bgcolor=#fefefe
| 0 ||  || MBA-I || 17.7 || data-sort-value="0.86" | 860 m || multiple || 2004–2021 || 18 Jan 2021 || 140 || align=left | Disc.: Spacewatch || 
|- id="2004 BK164" bgcolor=#d6d6d6
| 0 ||  || MBA-O || 16.97 || 2.2 km || multiple || 2004–2021 || 09 Dec 2021 || 162 || align=left | Disc.: Spacewatch || 
|- id="2004 BL164" bgcolor=#d6d6d6
| 0 ||  || MBA-O || 15.8 || 3.9 km || multiple || 2004–2021 || 18 Jan 2021 || 134 || align=left | Disc.: Spacewatch || 
|- id="2004 BM164" bgcolor=#d6d6d6
| 0 ||  || MBA-O || 16.53 || 2.8 km || multiple || 2004–2021 || 13 May 2021 || 113 || align=left | Disc.: Spacewatch || 
|- id="2004 BO164" bgcolor=#d6d6d6
| 0 ||  || MBA-O || 17.2 || 2.0 km || multiple || 2004–2020 || 29 Apr 2020 || 75 || align=left | Disc.: Spacewatch || 
|- id="2004 BP164" bgcolor=#fefefe
| 0 ||  || MBA-I || 18.64 || data-sort-value="0.56" | 560 m || multiple || 2004–2022 || 27 Jan 2022 || 83 || align=left | Disc.: Spacewatch || 
|- id="2004 BQ164" bgcolor=#E9E9E9
| 1 ||  || MBA-M || 16.71 || 1.4 km || multiple || 2004–2021 || 08 Apr 2021 || 130 || align=left | Disc.: NEAT || 
|- id="2004 BR164" bgcolor=#E9E9E9
| 0 ||  || MBA-M || 16.9 || 1.8 km || multiple || 2004–2021 || 16 Jan 2021 || 118 || align=left | Disc.: SDSS || 
|- id="2004 BS164" bgcolor=#d6d6d6
| 0 ||  || MBA-O || 17.27 || 2.0 km || multiple || 2004–2021 || 10 Aug 2021 || 88 || align=left | Disc.: Spacewatch || 
|- id="2004 BT164" bgcolor=#d6d6d6
| 0 ||  || MBA-O || 16.62 || 2.6 km || multiple || 2004–2021 || 08 Aug 2021 || 127 || align=left | Disc.: Spacewatch || 
|- id="2004 BU164" bgcolor=#E9E9E9
| 0 ||  || MBA-M || 17.62 || data-sort-value="0.89" | 890 m || multiple || 2004–2021 || 01 May 2021 || 100 || align=left | Disc.: Spacewatch || 
|- id="2004 BW164" bgcolor=#E9E9E9
| 0 ||  || MBA-M || 16.47 || 1.5 km || multiple || 2004–2021 || 10 Apr 2021 || 198 || align=left | Disc.: NEAT || 
|- id="2004 BX164" bgcolor=#fefefe
| 0 ||  || MBA-I || 18.61 || data-sort-value="0.56" | 560 m || multiple || 2004–2022 || 27 Jan 2022 || 81 || align=left | Disc.: Spacewatch || 
|- id="2004 BY164" bgcolor=#fefefe
| 0 ||  || MBA-I || 18.67 || data-sort-value="0.55" | 550 m || multiple || 2004–2021 || 10 Oct 2021 || 134 || align=left | Disc.: Spacewatch || 
|- id="2004 BZ164" bgcolor=#d6d6d6
| 0 ||  || MBA-O || 16.3 || 3.1 km || multiple || 2004–2021 || 15 Jun 2021 || 116 || align=left | Disc.: SDSSAlt.: 2010 MH136 || 
|- id="2004 BA165" bgcolor=#d6d6d6
| 0 ||  || MBA-O || 16.7 || 2.5 km || multiple || 2004–2020 || 28 Apr 2020 || 91 || align=left | Disc.: Spacewatch || 
|- id="2004 BB165" bgcolor=#E9E9E9
| 0 ||  || MBA-M || 17.1 || 2.1 km || multiple || 2004–2020 || 20 Oct 2020 || 111 || align=left | Disc.: Spacewatch || 
|- id="2004 BC165" bgcolor=#fefefe
| 0 ||  || MBA-I || 18.1 || data-sort-value="0.71" | 710 m || multiple || 2004–2020 || 20 Oct 2020 || 97 || align=left | Disc.: Spacewatch || 
|- id="2004 BD165" bgcolor=#E9E9E9
| 0 ||  || MBA-M || 16.80 || 1.8 km || multiple || 1993–2021 || 01 May 2021 || 163 || align=left | Disc.: SDSS || 
|- id="2004 BG165" bgcolor=#E9E9E9
| 0 ||  || MBA-M || 17.1 || 1.6 km || multiple || 2004–2021 || 06 Jan 2021 || 91 || align=left | Disc.: Spacewatch || 
|- id="2004 BH165" bgcolor=#d6d6d6
| 0 ||  || MBA-O || 17.36 || 1.9 km || multiple || 2004–2021 || 27 Oct 2021 || 81 || align=left | Disc.: Spacewatch || 
|- id="2004 BK165" bgcolor=#fefefe
| 0 ||  || MBA-I || 18.4 || data-sort-value="0.62" | 620 m || multiple || 2004–2019 || 28 Aug 2019 || 61 || align=left | Disc.: Spacewatch || 
|- id="2004 BL165" bgcolor=#d6d6d6
| 0 ||  || MBA-O || 16.17 || 3.2 km || multiple || 2002–2021 || 14 Apr 2021 || 156 || align=left | Disc.: Spacewatch || 
|- id="2004 BM165" bgcolor=#fefefe
| 0 ||  || MBA-I || 18.3 || data-sort-value="0.65" | 650 m || multiple || 2004–2021 || 05 Jan 2021 || 120 || align=left | Disc.: Spacewatch || 
|- id="2004 BN165" bgcolor=#d6d6d6
| 0 ||  || MBA-O || 16.1 || 3.4 km || multiple || 2004–2021 || 18 Jan 2021 || 106 || align=left | Disc.: Spacewatch || 
|- id="2004 BO165" bgcolor=#d6d6d6
| 0 ||  || MBA-O || 16.0 || 3.5 km || multiple || 2004–2021 || 17 Jan 2021 || 85 || align=left | Disc.: Spacewatch || 
|- id="2004 BQ165" bgcolor=#E9E9E9
| 0 ||  || MBA-M || 17.3 || 1.0 km || multiple || 2001–2021 || 07 Jun 2021 || 85 || align=left | Disc.: Spacewatch || 
|- id="2004 BR165" bgcolor=#fefefe
| 0 ||  || MBA-I || 18.86 || data-sort-value="0.50" | 500 m || multiple || 2004–2021 || 30 May 2021 || 89 || align=left | Disc.: Spacewatch || 
|- id="2004 BS165" bgcolor=#fefefe
| 0 ||  || MBA-I || 17.9 || data-sort-value="0.78" | 780 m || multiple || 2004–2021 || 24 Jan 2021 || 92 || align=left | Disc.: SDSS || 
|- id="2004 BT165" bgcolor=#d6d6d6
| 0 ||  || MBA-O || 16.1 || 3.4 km || multiple || 2004–2021 || 11 Jan 2021 || 96 || align=left | Disc.: LPL/Spacewatch II || 
|- id="2004 BU165" bgcolor=#fefefe
| 0 ||  || MBA-I || 18.57 || data-sort-value="0.57" | 570 m || multiple || 2004–2021 || 09 Jun 2021 || 90 || align=left | Disc.: Spacewatch || 
|- id="2004 BW165" bgcolor=#fefefe
| 0 ||  || MBA-I || 18.7 || data-sort-value="0.54" | 540 m || multiple || 2004–2020 || 17 Oct 2020 || 80 || align=left | Disc.: Spacewatch || 
|- id="2004 BY165" bgcolor=#d6d6d6
| 0 ||  || MBA-O || 16.5 || 2.8 km || multiple || 2004–2021 || 08 Jan 2021 || 75 || align=left | Disc.: Spacewatch || 
|- id="2004 BZ165" bgcolor=#fefefe
| 0 ||  || MBA-I || 18.47 || data-sort-value="0.60" | 600 m || multiple || 2004–2021 || 09 Dec 2021 || 72 || align=left | Disc.: Spacewatch || 
|- id="2004 BA166" bgcolor=#E9E9E9
| 0 ||  || MBA-M || 18.2 || data-sort-value="0.96" | 960 m || multiple || 2004–2017 || 18 Feb 2017 || 51 || align=left | Disc.: Spacewatch || 
|- id="2004 BB166" bgcolor=#E9E9E9
| 0 ||  || MBA-M || 17.0 || 1.7 km || multiple || 2004–2020 || 11 Dec 2020 || 89 || align=left | Disc.: SDSS || 
|- id="2004 BC166" bgcolor=#d6d6d6
| 0 ||  || MBA-O || 17.0 || 2.2 km || multiple || 2004–2019 || 31 Dec 2019 || 61 || align=left | Disc.: Spacewatch || 
|- id="2004 BE166" bgcolor=#E9E9E9
| 0 ||  || MBA-M || 17.5 || 1.3 km || multiple || 2004–2021 || 01 Jun 2021 || 103 || align=left | Disc.: SDSS || 
|- id="2004 BF166" bgcolor=#fefefe
| 0 ||  || MBA-I || 18.1 || data-sort-value="0.71" | 710 m || multiple || 2004–2020 || 17 Nov 2020 || 71 || align=left | Disc.: Spacewatch || 
|- id="2004 BG166" bgcolor=#fefefe
| 1 ||  || MBA-I || 18.7 || data-sort-value="0.54" | 540 m || multiple || 2004–2018 || 23 Jan 2018 || 53 || align=left | Disc.: Spacewatch || 
|- id="2004 BH166" bgcolor=#fefefe
| 0 ||  || MBA-I || 18.4 || data-sort-value="0.62" | 620 m || multiple || 2004–2020 || 11 Nov 2020 || 59 || align=left | Disc.: Spacewatch || 
|- id="2004 BL166" bgcolor=#d6d6d6
| 0 ||  || MBA-O || 16.7 || 2.5 km || multiple || 2004–2020 || 28 Apr 2020 || 48 || align=left | Disc.: Spacewatch || 
|- id="2004 BM166" bgcolor=#fefefe
| 0 ||  || MBA-I || 17.9 || data-sort-value="0.78" | 780 m || multiple || 2004–2020 || 22 Nov 2020 || 52 || align=left | Disc.: SDSS || 
|- id="2004 BO166" bgcolor=#E9E9E9
| 0 ||  || MBA-M || 17.77 || 1.6 km || multiple || 2004–2022 || 07 Jan 2022 || 89 || align=left | Disc.: Spacewatch || 
|- id="2004 BP166" bgcolor=#d6d6d6
| 0 ||  || MBA-O || 17.27 || 2.0 km || multiple || 2004–2021 || 09 May 2021 || 65 || align=left | Disc.: Spacewatch || 
|- id="2004 BQ166" bgcolor=#d6d6d6
| 0 ||  || MBA-O || 16.97 || 2.2 km || multiple || 2004–2021 || 10 Apr 2021 || 80 || align=left | Disc.: SDSSAlt.: 2009 AH58 || 
|- id="2004 BR166" bgcolor=#d6d6d6
| 0 ||  || MBA-O || 16.52 || 2.8 km || multiple || 2004–2021 || 05 Aug 2021 || 117 || align=left | Disc.: SpacewatchAlt.: 2010 LP89 || 
|- id="2004 BS166" bgcolor=#E9E9E9
| 0 ||  || MBA-M || 17.43 || 1.8 km || multiple || 2002–2022 || 22 Jan 2022 || 120 || align=left | Disc.: LONEOS || 
|- id="2004 BT166" bgcolor=#fefefe
| 0 ||  || MBA-I || 17.9 || data-sort-value="0.78" | 780 m || multiple || 2004–2020 || 12 Sep 2020 || 74 || align=left | Disc.: Spacewatch || 
|- id="2004 BV166" bgcolor=#fefefe
| 0 ||  || HUN || 18.62 || data-sort-value="0.56" | 560 m || multiple || 2004–2021 || 25 Nov 2021 || 68 || align=left | Disc.: Spacewatch || 
|- id="2004 BW166" bgcolor=#d6d6d6
| 0 ||  || MBA-O || 16.18 || 3.2 km || multiple || 2004–2021 || 04 Apr 2021 || 175 || align=left | Disc.: NEATAlt.: 2010 LW3 || 
|- id="2004 BX166" bgcolor=#fefefe
| 0 ||  || MBA-I || 18.1 || data-sort-value="0.71" | 710 m || multiple || 2004–2021 || 08 Jan 2021 || 123 || align=left | Disc.: Spacewatch || 
|- id="2004 BY166" bgcolor=#fefefe
| 0 ||  || MBA-I || 18.58 || data-sort-value="0.57" | 570 m || multiple || 2004–2022 || 27 Jan 2022 || 54 || align=left | Disc.: Spacewatch || 
|- id="2004 BZ166" bgcolor=#fefefe
| 0 ||  || MBA-I || 18.90 || data-sort-value="0.49" | 490 m || multiple || 2004–2021 || 04 May 2021 || 62 || align=left | Disc.: Spacewatch || 
|- id="2004 BA167" bgcolor=#E9E9E9
| 0 ||  || MBA-M || 17.65 || 1.2 km || multiple || 2004–2021 || 12 May 2021 || 110 || align=left | Disc.: SDSS || 
|- id="2004 BC167" bgcolor=#fefefe
| 0 ||  || MBA-I || 18.6 || data-sort-value="0.57" | 570 m || multiple || 2004–2020 || 10 Nov 2020 || 89 || align=left | Disc.: Spacewatch || 
|- id="2004 BD167" bgcolor=#E9E9E9
| 0 ||  || MBA-M || 17.5 || 1.3 km || multiple || 2004–2021 || 16 Jan 2021 || 56 || align=left | Disc.: SDSS || 
|- id="2004 BF167" bgcolor=#E9E9E9
| 0 ||  || MBA-M || 17.68 || data-sort-value="0.87" | 870 m || multiple || 2004–2021 || 18 May 2021 || 111 || align=left | Disc.: Spacewatch || 
|- id="2004 BH167" bgcolor=#fefefe
| 0 ||  || MBA-I || 18.91 || data-sort-value="0.49" | 490 m || multiple || 2004–2022 || 08 Jan 2022 || 51 || align=left | Disc.: Spacewatch || 
|- id="2004 BJ167" bgcolor=#E9E9E9
| 2 ||  || MBA-M || 18.5 || data-sort-value="0.59" | 590 m || multiple || 2004–2019 || 01 Nov 2019 || 82 || align=left | Disc.: Spacewatch || 
|- id="2004 BK167" bgcolor=#E9E9E9
| 0 ||  || MBA-M || 17.5 || 1.3 km || multiple || 2004–2020 || 12 Dec 2020 || 42 || align=left | Disc.: SDSS || 
|- id="2004 BM167" bgcolor=#E9E9E9
| 0 ||  || MBA-M || 17.7 || 1.2 km || multiple || 2003–2021 || 18 Jan 2021 || 57 || align=left | Disc.: Spacewatch || 
|- id="2004 BN167" bgcolor=#fefefe
| 0 ||  || HUN || 18.84 || data-sort-value="0.51" | 510 m || multiple || 2004–2022 || 22 Jan 2022 || 53 || align=left | Disc.: Spacewatch || 
|- id="2004 BP167" bgcolor=#E9E9E9
| 0 ||  || MBA-M || 17.5 || 1.8 km || multiple || 2004–2021 || 05 Jan 2021 || 74 || align=left | Disc.: Spacewatch || 
|- id="2004 BR167" bgcolor=#d6d6d6
| 0 ||  || MBA-O || 15.55 || 4.3 km || multiple || 2004–2021 || 27 Nov 2021 || 189 || align=left | Disc.: SpacewatchAlt.: 2010 GO50 || 
|- id="2004 BS167" bgcolor=#E9E9E9
| 0 ||  || MBA-M || 17.7 || 1.2 km || multiple || 2002–2020 || 15 Dec 2020 || 42 || align=left | Disc.: Cerro TololoAlt.: 2002 PS149 || 
|- id="2004 BT167" bgcolor=#fefefe
| 0 ||  || MBA-I || 18.1 || data-sort-value="0.71" | 710 m || multiple || 2004–2021 || 07 Jun 2021 || 89 || align=left | Disc.: Spacewatch || 
|- id="2004 BU167" bgcolor=#fefefe
| 2 ||  || MBA-I || 18.7 || data-sort-value="0.54" | 540 m || multiple || 2004–2018 || 15 Apr 2018 || 38 || align=left | Disc.: Spacewatch || 
|- id="2004 BV167" bgcolor=#d6d6d6
| 0 ||  || MBA-O || 17.44 || 1.8 km || multiple || 2004–2021 || 30 Oct 2021 || 57 || align=left | Disc.: SDSS || 
|- id="2004 BW167" bgcolor=#d6d6d6
| 0 ||  || MBA-O || 16.82 || 2.4 km || multiple || 2004–2021 || 10 Apr 2021 || 65 || align=left | Disc.: Spacewatch || 
|- id="2004 BY167" bgcolor=#fefefe
| 2 ||  || MBA-I || 18.7 || data-sort-value="0.54" | 540 m || multiple || 2004–2018 || 16 May 2018 || 31 || align=left | Disc.: LPL/Spacewatch II || 
|- id="2004 BZ167" bgcolor=#d6d6d6
| 0 ||  || MBA-O || 17.2 || 2.0 km || multiple || 2004–2020 || 23 Jan 2020 || 68 || align=left | Disc.: Spacewatch || 
|- id="2004 BA168" bgcolor=#d6d6d6
| 0 ||  || MBA-O || 16.3 || 3.1 km || multiple || 2004–2021 || 14 Jun 2021 || 122 || align=left | Disc.: SpacewatchAlt.: 2010 LR117 || 
|- id="2004 BB168" bgcolor=#E9E9E9
| 0 ||  || MBA-M || 17.5 || 1.8 km || multiple || 2004–2020 || 15 Sep 2020 || 38 || align=left | Disc.: Spacewatch || 
|- id="2004 BC168" bgcolor=#fefefe
| 0 ||  || MBA-I || 18.7 || data-sort-value="0.54" | 540 m || multiple || 2004–2021 || 04 Jan 2021 || 44 || align=left | Disc.: Spacewatch || 
|- id="2004 BE168" bgcolor=#E9E9E9
| 0 ||  || MBA-M || 17.5 || 1.3 km || multiple || 2004–2020 || 11 Dec 2020 || 49 || align=left | Disc.: SDSS || 
|- id="2004 BF168" bgcolor=#E9E9E9
| 0 ||  || MBA-M || 17.7 || 1.2 km || multiple || 2004–2021 || 05 Jan 2021 || 57 || align=left | Disc.: Spacewatch || 
|- id="2004 BG168" bgcolor=#fefefe
| 0 ||  || HUN || 18.1 || data-sort-value="0.71" | 710 m || multiple || 2004–2019 || 15 Dec 2019 || 48 || align=left | Disc.: Spacewatch || 
|- id="2004 BH168" bgcolor=#fefefe
| 0 ||  || MBA-I || 18.34 || data-sort-value="0.64" | 640 m || multiple || 2002–2022 || 25 Jan 2022 || 57 || align=left | Disc.: Spacewatch || 
|- id="2004 BJ168" bgcolor=#fefefe
| 0 ||  || MBA-I || 18.3 || data-sort-value="0.65" | 650 m || multiple || 2004–2020 || 17 Dec 2020 || 93 || align=left | Disc.: Spacewatch || 
|- id="2004 BK168" bgcolor=#fefefe
| 0 ||  || MBA-I || 19.30 || data-sort-value="0.41" | 410 m || multiple || 2004–2022 || 27 Jan 2022 || 38 || align=left | Disc.: Spacewatch || 
|- id="2004 BL168" bgcolor=#d6d6d6
| 0 ||  || MBA-O || 17.1 || 2.1 km || multiple || 2004–2020 || 17 Feb 2020 || 31 || align=left | Disc.: SDSS || 
|- id="2004 BM168" bgcolor=#E9E9E9
| 2 ||  || MBA-M || 18.4 || data-sort-value="0.62" | 620 m || multiple || 2004–2019 || 17 Dec 2019 || 62 || align=left | Disc.: Spacewatch || 
|- id="2004 BN168" bgcolor=#E9E9E9
| 0 ||  || MBA-M || 17.89 || 1.1 km || multiple || 2004–2021 || 02 Apr 2021 || 49 || align=left | Disc.: SDSS || 
|- id="2004 BO168" bgcolor=#E9E9E9
| 0 ||  || MBA-M || 17.9 || 1.1 km || multiple || 2004–2020 || 20 Dec 2020 || 34 || align=left | Disc.: Spacewatch || 
|- id="2004 BP168" bgcolor=#E9E9E9
| 0 ||  || MBA-M || 17.6 || 1.3 km || multiple || 2004–2020 || 23 Dec 2020 || 46 || align=left | Disc.: SDSS || 
|- id="2004 BQ168" bgcolor=#E9E9E9
| 0 ||  || MBA-M || 16.9 || 1.8 km || multiple || 2004–2021 || 16 Jan 2021 || 73 || align=left | Disc.: SpacewatchAlt.: 2019 OS11 || 
|- id="2004 BR168" bgcolor=#E9E9E9
| 2 ||  || MBA-M || 18.1 || 1.0 km || multiple || 2004–2021 || 09 Jan 2021 || 21 || align=left | Disc.: Spacewatch || 
|- id="2004 BS168" bgcolor=#d6d6d6
| 0 ||  || MBA-O || 17.70 || 1.6 km || multiple || 2004–2021 || 08 Apr 2021 || 36 || align=left | Disc.: Spacewatch || 
|- id="2004 BT168" bgcolor=#d6d6d6
| 0 ||  || MBA-O || 16.9 || 2.3 km || multiple || 2004–2019 || 25 Nov 2019 || 36 || align=left | Disc.: SDSS || 
|- id="2004 BU168" bgcolor=#E9E9E9
| 0 ||  || MBA-M || 17.4 || 1.4 km || multiple || 2004–2021 || 15 Jan 2021 || 96 || align=left | Disc.: Spacewatch || 
|- id="2004 BV168" bgcolor=#d6d6d6
| 0 ||  || MBA-O || 16.2 || 3.2 km || multiple || 2004–2021 || 23 Jan 2021 || 100 || align=left | Disc.: Spacewatch || 
|- id="2004 BW168" bgcolor=#d6d6d6
| 0 ||  || MBA-O || 15.9 || 3.7 km || multiple || 2004–2021 || 18 Jan 2021 || 129 || align=left | Disc.: SDSS || 
|- id="2004 BX168" bgcolor=#E9E9E9
| 0 ||  || MBA-M || 17.0 || 2.2 km || multiple || 2004–2020 || 14 Nov 2020 || 114 || align=left | Disc.: Spacewatch || 
|- id="2004 BY168" bgcolor=#fefefe
| 0 ||  || MBA-I || 18.64 || data-sort-value="0.56" | 560 m || multiple || 2004–2022 || 25 Jan 2022 || 81 || align=left | Disc.: Spacewatch || 
|- id="2004 BZ168" bgcolor=#d6d6d6
| 0 ||  || MBA-O || 16.6 || 2.7 km || multiple || 2004–2021 || 01 Jun 2021 || 120 || align=left | Disc.: Spacewatch || 
|- id="2004 BB169" bgcolor=#d6d6d6
| 0 ||  || MBA-O || 16.5 || 2.8 km || multiple || 2004–2021 || 21 Jan 2021 || 84 || align=left | Disc.: SDSS || 
|- id="2004 BC169" bgcolor=#fefefe
| 0 ||  || MBA-I || 18.86 || data-sort-value="0.50" | 500 m || multiple || 2004–2021 || 10 May 2021 || 76 || align=left | Disc.: Spacewatch || 
|- id="2004 BD169" bgcolor=#fefefe
| 0 ||  || MBA-I || 18.08 || data-sort-value="0.72" | 720 m || multiple || 2004–2021 || 06 May 2021 || 114 || align=left | Disc.: LPL/Spacewatch II || 
|- id="2004 BE169" bgcolor=#d6d6d6
| 0 ||  || MBA-O || 17.36 || 1.9 km || multiple || 1999–2021 || 15 Apr 2021 || 80 || align=left | Disc.: SDSS || 
|- id="2004 BF169" bgcolor=#d6d6d6
| 0 ||  || MBA-O || 17.2 || 2.0 km || multiple || 2004–2019 || 09 Nov 2019 || 61 || align=left | Disc.: Spacewatch || 
|- id="2004 BG169" bgcolor=#d6d6d6
| 0 ||  || MBA-O || 16.4 || 2.9 km || multiple || 2004–2021 || 18 Jan 2021 || 78 || align=left | Disc.: Spacewatch || 
|- id="2004 BH169" bgcolor=#d6d6d6
| 0 ||  || MBA-O || 16.43 || 2.9 km || multiple || 2004–2021 || 14 Apr 2021 || 125 || align=left | Disc.: Spacewatch || 
|- id="2004 BJ169" bgcolor=#d6d6d6
| 0 ||  || MBA-O || 16.5 || 2.8 km || multiple || 2004–2020 || 23 Dec 2020 || 72 || align=left | Disc.: Spacewatch || 
|- id="2004 BK169" bgcolor=#d6d6d6
| 0 ||  || MBA-O || 16.71 || 2.5 km || multiple || 2004–2021 || 09 Apr 2021 || 79 || align=left | Disc.: Spacewatch || 
|- id="2004 BL169" bgcolor=#d6d6d6
| 0 ||  || MBA-O || 16.5 || 2.8 km || multiple || 2004–2021 || 17 Jan 2021 || 78 || align=left | Disc.: Spacewatch || 
|- id="2004 BM169" bgcolor=#d6d6d6
| 0 ||  || MBA-O || 16.4 || 2.9 km || multiple || 2004–2021 || 12 Jan 2021 || 73 || align=left | Disc.: Spacewatch || 
|- id="2004 BN169" bgcolor=#fefefe
| 1 ||  || MBA-I || 18.3 || data-sort-value="0.65" | 650 m || multiple || 2004–2018 || 14 Dec 2018 || 56 || align=left | Disc.: Spacewatch || 
|- id="2004 BQ169" bgcolor=#d6d6d6
| 0 ||  || MBA-O || 16.6 || 2.7 km || multiple || 2004–2020 || 11 May 2020 || 73 || align=left | Disc.: LPL/Spacewatch II || 
|- id="2004 BR169" bgcolor=#d6d6d6
| 0 ||  || MBA-O || 16.33 || 3.0 km || multiple || 2004–2021 || 17 Apr 2021 || 137 || align=left | Disc.: NEATAlt.: 2010 KS106 || 
|- id="2004 BT169" bgcolor=#d6d6d6
| 0 ||  || MBA-O || 16.72 || 2.5 km || multiple || 2004–2021 || 04 Apr 2021 || 93 || align=left | Disc.: Spacewatch || 
|- id="2004 BU169" bgcolor=#d6d6d6
| 0 ||  || MBA-O || 16.2 || 3.2 km || multiple || 2004–2021 || 18 Jan 2021 || 90 || align=left | Disc.: Spacewatch || 
|- id="2004 BV169" bgcolor=#fefefe
| 0 ||  || MBA-I || 17.77 || data-sort-value="0.83" | 830 m || multiple || 2004–2021 || 25 Nov 2021 || 72 || align=left | Disc.: SDSS || 
|- id="2004 BW169" bgcolor=#fefefe
| 0 ||  || MBA-I || 18.50 || data-sort-value="0.59" | 590 m || multiple || 2004–2021 || 10 Oct 2021 || 89 || align=left | Disc.: Spacewatch || 
|- id="2004 BX169" bgcolor=#d6d6d6
| 0 ||  || MBA-O || 17.1 || 2.1 km || multiple || 2004–2019 || 06 Jan 2019 || 50 || align=left | Disc.: SDSS || 
|- id="2004 BY169" bgcolor=#d6d6d6
| 0 ||  || MBA-O || 16.2 || 3.2 km || multiple || 2004–2021 || 18 Jan 2021 || 76 || align=left | Disc.: Spacewatch || 
|- id="2004 BZ169" bgcolor=#E9E9E9
| 0 ||  || MBA-M || 17.8 || data-sort-value="0.82" | 820 m || multiple || 2004–2019 || 04 Nov 2019 || 61 || align=left | Disc.: Spacewatch || 
|- id="2004 BA170" bgcolor=#fefefe
| 0 ||  || MBA-I || 18.03 || data-sort-value="0.74" | 740 m || multiple || 2004–2021 || 08 May 2021 || 99 || align=left | Disc.: Spacewatch || 
|- id="2004 BB170" bgcolor=#d6d6d6
| 0 ||  || MBA-O || 16.43 || 2.9 km || multiple || 2004–2021 || 09 May 2021 || 108 || align=left | Disc.: SpacewatchAlt.: 2010 LT24 || 
|- id="2004 BC170" bgcolor=#d6d6d6
| 0 ||  || MBA-O || 16.6 || 2.7 km || multiple || 2004–2019 || 28 Dec 2019 || 70 || align=left | Disc.: Spacewatch || 
|- id="2004 BD170" bgcolor=#d6d6d6
| 0 ||  || MBA-O || 17.0 || 2.2 km || multiple || 2004–2021 || 18 Jan 2021 || 56 || align=left | Disc.: Spacewatch || 
|- id="2004 BF170" bgcolor=#E9E9E9
| 0 ||  || MBA-M || 17.17 || 1.5 km || multiple || 2004–2022 || 27 Jan 2022 || 58 || align=left | Disc.: SDSS || 
|- id="2004 BG170" bgcolor=#E9E9E9
| 0 ||  || MBA-M || 17.60 || data-sort-value="0.90" | 900 m || multiple || 2004–2021 || 12 May 2021 || 77 || align=left | Disc.: Spacewatch || 
|- id="2004 BH170" bgcolor=#d6d6d6
| 0 ||  || MBA-O || 16.89 || 2.3 km || multiple || 2004–2021 || 10 Apr 2021 || 102 || align=left | Disc.: SDSS || 
|- id="2004 BJ170" bgcolor=#E9E9E9
| 1 ||  || MBA-M || 18.4 || data-sort-value="0.62" | 620 m || multiple || 2004–2020 || 24 Jan 2020 || 62 || align=left | Disc.: Spacewatch || 
|- id="2004 BK170" bgcolor=#d6d6d6
| 0 ||  || MBA-O || 16.3 || 3.1 km || multiple || 2004–2020 || 22 Dec 2020 || 74 || align=left | Disc.: Spacewatch || 
|- id="2004 BL170" bgcolor=#fefefe
| 0 ||  || MBA-I || 17.3 || 1.0 km || multiple || 2004–2020 || 15 Dec 2020 || 62 || align=left | Disc.: NEATAlt.: 2018 CT9 || 
|- id="2004 BO170" bgcolor=#E9E9E9
| 0 ||  || MBA-M || 18.1 || 1.0 km || multiple || 2004–2021 || 24 Jan 2021 || 50 || align=left | Disc.: Spacewatch || 
|- id="2004 BP170" bgcolor=#d6d6d6
| 0 ||  || MBA-O || 16.3 || 3.1 km || multiple || 2004–2021 || 16 Jan 2021 || 52 || align=left | Disc.: Spacewatch || 
|- id="2004 BQ170" bgcolor=#fefefe
| 0 ||  || MBA-I || 18.5 || data-sort-value="0.59" | 590 m || multiple || 2004–2019 || 08 Feb 2019 || 50 || align=left | Disc.: Spacewatch || 
|- id="2004 BR170" bgcolor=#d6d6d6
| 0 ||  || MBA-O || 16.4 || 2.9 km || multiple || 2004–2021 || 17 Jan 2021 || 69 || align=left | Disc.: Spacewatch || 
|- id="2004 BS170" bgcolor=#fefefe
| 0 ||  || MBA-I || 18.19 || data-sort-value="0.68" | 680 m || multiple || 2004–2021 || 09 Jul 2021 || 47 || align=left | Disc.: Spacewatch || 
|- id="2004 BT170" bgcolor=#d6d6d6
| 2 ||  || MBA-O || 17.8 || 1.5 km || multiple || 2004–2019 || 26 Feb 2019 || 38 || align=left | Disc.: Spacewatch || 
|- id="2004 BU170" bgcolor=#fefefe
| 0 ||  || MBA-I || 18.98 || data-sort-value="0.48" | 480 m || multiple || 2004–2021 || 07 Oct 2021 || 59 || align=left | Disc.: Spacewatch || 
|- id="2004 BV170" bgcolor=#E9E9E9
| 0 ||  || MBA-M || 17.7 || 1.2 km || multiple || 2004–2021 || 18 Jan 2021 || 47 || align=left | Disc.: Spacewatch || 
|- id="2004 BW170" bgcolor=#d6d6d6
| 0 ||  || MBA-O || 17.51 || 1.8 km || multiple || 2004–2021 || 06 Oct 2021 || 62 || align=left | Disc.: SDSS || 
|- id="2004 BZ170" bgcolor=#d6d6d6
| 0 ||  || MBA-O || 16.88 || 2.3 km || multiple || 2004–2021 || 12 May 2021 || 53 || align=left | Disc.: SDSS || 
|- id="2004 BA171" bgcolor=#E9E9E9
| 1 ||  || MBA-M || 17.4 || 1.4 km || multiple || 2004–2020 || 24 Dec 2020 || 49 || align=left | Disc.: Spacewatch || 
|- id="2004 BB171" bgcolor=#d6d6d6
| 0 ||  || MBA-O || 17.06 || 2.2 km || multiple || 2004–2021 || 10 Apr 2021 || 58 || align=left | Disc.: Spacewatch || 
|- id="2004 BC171" bgcolor=#fefefe
| 0 ||  || MBA-I || 18.21 || data-sort-value="0.68" | 680 m || multiple || 2004–2021 || 06 Nov 2021 || 47 || align=left | Disc.: NEAT || 
|- id="2004 BD171" bgcolor=#d6d6d6
| 0 ||  || MBA-O || 16.83 || 2.4 km || multiple || 2004–2021 || 12 May 2021 || 71 || align=left | Disc.: Spacewatch || 
|- id="2004 BF171" bgcolor=#d6d6d6
| 0 ||  || MBA-O || 17.42 || 1.8 km || multiple || 2004–2021 || 09 Apr 2021 || 49 || align=left | Disc.: Spacewatch || 
|- id="2004 BH171" bgcolor=#E9E9E9
| 0 ||  || MBA-M || 18.19 || data-sort-value="0.68" | 680 m || multiple || 2004–2021 || 14 May 2021 || 76 || align=left | Disc.: SDSS || 
|- id="2004 BJ171" bgcolor=#E9E9E9
| 0 ||  || MBA-M || 17.89 || 1.1 km || multiple || 2004–2021 || 09 Apr 2021 || 48 || align=left | Disc.: SDSS || 
|- id="2004 BL171" bgcolor=#E9E9E9
| 0 ||  || MBA-M || 17.9 || 1.1 km || multiple || 2004–2019 || 06 Sep 2019 || 121 || align=left | Disc.: Spacewatch || 
|- id="2004 BM171" bgcolor=#E9E9E9
| 0 ||  || MBA-M || 17.2 || 2.0 km || multiple || 2004–2020 || 05 Nov 2020 || 98 || align=left | Disc.: Spacewatch || 
|- id="2004 BO171" bgcolor=#E9E9E9
| 0 ||  || MBA-M || 17.2 || 1.5 km || multiple || 2004–2021 || 06 Jan 2021 || 62 || align=left | Disc.: Spacewatch || 
|- id="2004 BP171" bgcolor=#E9E9E9
| 0 ||  || MBA-M || 17.2 || 1.5 km || multiple || 1996–2021 || 04 Jan 2021 || 65 || align=left | Disc.: Spacewatch || 
|- id="2004 BS171" bgcolor=#E9E9E9
| 0 ||  || MBA-M || 17.65 || 1.6 km || multiple || 2004–2021 || 26 Nov 2021 || 74 || align=left | Disc.: Spacewatch || 
|- id="2004 BT171" bgcolor=#d6d6d6
| 0 ||  || MBA-O || 16.92 || 2.3 km || multiple || 2004–2021 || 08 Aug 2021 || 95 || align=left | Disc.: Spacewatch || 
|- id="2004 BU171" bgcolor=#fefefe
| 0 ||  || MBA-I || 18.3 || data-sort-value="0.65" | 650 m || multiple || 2004–2020 || 24 Jan 2020 || 60 || align=left | Disc.: SpacewatchAlt.: 2010 BX10 || 
|- id="2004 BV171" bgcolor=#fefefe
| 0 ||  || MBA-I || 18.9 || data-sort-value="0.49" | 490 m || multiple || 2004–2020 || 23 Oct 2020 || 49 || align=left | Disc.: Spacewatch || 
|- id="2004 BW171" bgcolor=#d6d6d6
| 0 ||  || MBA-O || 17.3 || 1.9 km || multiple || 2004–2020 || 26 May 2020 || 59 || align=left | Disc.: Spacewatch || 
|- id="2004 BX171" bgcolor=#d6d6d6
| 0 ||  || MBA-O || 17.1 || 2.1 km || multiple || 2004–2021 || 18 Jan 2021 || 51 || align=left | Disc.: Spacewatch || 
|- id="2004 BY171" bgcolor=#E9E9E9
| 0 ||  || MBA-M || 17.3 || 1.5 km || multiple || 2004–2021 || 12 Jan 2021 || 59 || align=left | Disc.: Spacewatch || 
|- id="2004 BZ171" bgcolor=#E9E9E9
| 0 ||  || MBA-M || 17.5 || 1.3 km || multiple || 2004–2021 || 18 Jan 2021 || 84 || align=left | Disc.: Spacewatch || 
|- id="2004 BA172" bgcolor=#d6d6d6
| 0 ||  || MBA-O || 16.57 || 2.7 km || multiple || 2004–2021 || 07 Apr 2021 || 104 || align=left | Disc.: SDSS || 
|- id="2004 BB172" bgcolor=#d6d6d6
| 0 ||  || MBA-O || 16.2 || 3.2 km || multiple || 2004–2021 || 15 Jan 2021 || 81 || align=left | Disc.: Spacewatch || 
|- id="2004 BD172" bgcolor=#fefefe
| 0 ||  || MBA-I || 18.54 || data-sort-value="0.58" | 580 m || multiple || 2004–2021 || 11 Apr 2021 || 61 || align=left | Disc.: Spacewatch || 
|- id="2004 BE172" bgcolor=#d6d6d6
| 0 ||  || MBA-O || 16.5 || 2.8 km || multiple || 2004–2021 || 12 Jan 2021 || 76 || align=left | Disc.: LPL/Spacewatch II || 
|- id="2004 BF172" bgcolor=#E9E9E9
| 0 ||  || MBA-M || 17.33 || 1.4 km || multiple || 2004–2022 || 27 Jan 2022 || 48 || align=left | Disc.: Spacewatch || 
|- id="2004 BG172" bgcolor=#E9E9E9
| 3 ||  || MBA-M || 18.8 || data-sort-value="0.52" | 520 m || multiple || 2004–2020 || 02 Feb 2020 || 50 || align=left | Disc.: Spacewatch || 
|- id="2004 BH172" bgcolor=#d6d6d6
| 0 ||  || MBA-O || 16.84 || 2.4 km || multiple || 2004–2021 || 09 May 2021 || 48 || align=left | Disc.: SDSS || 
|- id="2004 BJ172" bgcolor=#E9E9E9
| 0 ||  || MBA-M || 18.0 || 1.1 km || multiple || 2004–2021 || 18 Jan 2021 || 43 || align=left | Disc.: Spacewatch || 
|- id="2004 BK172" bgcolor=#d6d6d6
| 0 ||  || MBA-O || 17.1 || 2.1 km || multiple || 2004–2019 || 29 Nov 2019 || 28 || align=left | Disc.: Spacewatch || 
|- id="2004 BL172" bgcolor=#E9E9E9
| 0 ||  || MBA-M || 17.7 || 1.2 km || multiple || 2004–2021 || 04 Jan 2021 || 38 || align=left | Disc.: Spacewatch || 
|- id="2004 BM172" bgcolor=#d6d6d6
| 0 ||  || MBA-O || 17.5 || 1.8 km || multiple || 2004–2020 || 22 Mar 2020 || 24 || align=left | Disc.: SDSS || 
|- id="2004 BN172" bgcolor=#E9E9E9
| 0 ||  || MBA-M || 17.8 || 1.2 km || multiple || 1994–2021 || 18 Jan 2021 || 168 || align=left | Disc.: Spacewatch || 
|- id="2004 BO172" bgcolor=#d6d6d6
| 0 ||  || MBA-O || 16.3 || 3.1 km || multiple || 2004–2021 || 06 Jun 2021 || 98 || align=left | Disc.: Spacewatch || 
|- id="2004 BP172" bgcolor=#d6d6d6
| 0 ||  || MBA-O || 16.99 || 2.2 km || multiple || 2004–2021 || 16 Apr 2021 || 72 || align=left | Disc.: Spacewatch || 
|- id="2004 BR172" bgcolor=#d6d6d6
| 0 ||  || MBA-O || 16.6 || 2.7 km || multiple || 2004–2019 || 28 Dec 2019 || 62 || align=left | Disc.: Spacewatch || 
|- id="2004 BS172" bgcolor=#E9E9E9
| 0 ||  || MBA-M || 17.76 || 1.2 km || multiple || 2003–2021 || 12 Apr 2021 || 130 || align=left | Disc.: Spacewatch || 
|- id="2004 BT172" bgcolor=#d6d6d6
| 0 ||  || MBA-O || 16.77 || 2.5 km || multiple || 2004–2021 || 14 Apr 2021 || 69 || align=left | Disc.: Spacewatch || 
|- id="2004 BU172" bgcolor=#d6d6d6
| 0 ||  || MBA-O || 16.4 || 2.9 km || multiple || 1999–2021 || 18 Jan 2021 || 84 || align=left | Disc.: Spacewatch || 
|- id="2004 BV172" bgcolor=#d6d6d6
| 0 ||  || MBA-O || 16.7 || 2.5 km || multiple || 2004–2021 || 17 Jan 2021 || 71 || align=left | Disc.: Spacewatch || 
|- id="2004 BW172" bgcolor=#E9E9E9
| 0 ||  || MBA-M || 17.4 || 1.4 km || multiple || 2004–2020 || 07 Dec 2020 || 71 || align=left | Disc.: Spacewatch || 
|- id="2004 BX172" bgcolor=#d6d6d6
| 0 ||  || MBA-O || 17.2 || 2.0 km || multiple || 2004–2020 || 19 Jan 2020 || 44 || align=left | Disc.: SDSS || 
|- id="2004 BY172" bgcolor=#E9E9E9
| 0 ||  || MBA-M || 17.4 || 1.4 km || multiple || 2004–2020 || 09 Dec 2020 || 56 || align=left | Disc.: Spacewatch || 
|- id="2004 BZ172" bgcolor=#d6d6d6
| 0 ||  || MBA-O || 16.7 || 2.5 km || multiple || 2004–2021 || 10 Jan 2021 || 69 || align=left | Disc.: Spacewatch || 
|- id="2004 BA173" bgcolor=#d6d6d6
| 0 ||  || MBA-O || 16.9 || 2.3 km || multiple || 2004–2020 || 30 Jan 2020 || 55 || align=left | Disc.: Spacewatch || 
|- id="2004 BB173" bgcolor=#d6d6d6
| 0 ||  || MBA-O || 16.4 || 2.9 km || multiple || 2004–2021 || 04 Jan 2021 || 43 || align=left | Disc.: Spacewatch || 
|- id="2004 BC173" bgcolor=#E9E9E9
| 0 ||  || MBA-M || 17.3 || 1.5 km || multiple || 2004–2021 || 18 Jan 2021 || 43 || align=left | Disc.: Spacewatch || 
|- id="2004 BD173" bgcolor=#d6d6d6
| 0 ||  || MBA-O || 17.0 || 2.2 km || multiple || 2004–2021 || 12 Jun 2021 || 64 || align=left | Disc.: Spacewatch || 
|- id="2004 BE173" bgcolor=#E9E9E9
| 0 ||  || MBA-M || 18.3 || data-sort-value="0.92" | 920 m || multiple || 2004–2021 || 17 Jan 2021 || 41 || align=left | Disc.: Spacewatch || 
|- id="2004 BF173" bgcolor=#E9E9E9
| 0 ||  || MBA-M || 17.50 || data-sort-value="0.94" | 940 m || multiple || 2004–2021 || 19 Apr 2021 || 81 || align=left | Disc.: SpacewatchAdded on 22 July 2020 || 
|- id="2004 BG173" bgcolor=#fefefe
| 0 ||  || MBA-I || 18.5 || data-sort-value="0.59" | 590 m || multiple || 2004–2020 || 18 Dec 2020 || 31 || align=left | Disc.: LPL/Spacewatch IIAdded on 22 July 2020 || 
|- id="2004 BH173" bgcolor=#d6d6d6
| 3 ||  || MBA-O || 18.0 || 1.4 km || multiple || 2004–2020 || 16 Mar 2020 || 35 || align=left | Disc.: SpacewatchAdded on 22 July 2020 || 
|- id="2004 BJ173" bgcolor=#fefefe
| 1 ||  || MBA-I || 18.8 || data-sort-value="0.52" | 520 m || multiple || 2004–2020 || 05 Nov 2020 || 40 || align=left | Disc.: SpacewatchAdded on 19 October 2020 || 
|- id="2004 BK173" bgcolor=#d6d6d6
| 0 ||  || MBA-O || 16.6 || 2.7 km || multiple || 2000–2021 || 07 Jun 2021 || 85 || align=left | Disc.: SpacewatchAdded on 17 January 2021 || 
|- id="2004 BL173" bgcolor=#E9E9E9
| 2 ||  || MBA-M || 18.1 || 1.0 km || multiple || 2004–2020 || 20 Oct 2020 || 42 || align=left | Disc.: SpacewatchAdded on 17 January 2021 || 
|- id="2004 BN173" bgcolor=#E9E9E9
| 0 ||  || MBA-M || 17.8 || 1.2 km || multiple || 2004–2021 || 11 Jan 2021 || 88 || align=left | Disc.: SpacewatchAdded on 17 January 2021 || 
|- id="2004 BO173" bgcolor=#E9E9E9
| 0 ||  || MBA-M || 18.2 || data-sort-value="0.96" | 960 m || multiple || 2004–2020 || 17 Nov 2020 || 50 || align=left | Disc.: SpacewatchAdded on 17 January 2021 || 
|- id="2004 BQ173" bgcolor=#E9E9E9
| 0 ||  || MBA-M || 17.5 || 1.3 km || multiple || 2004–2020 || 23 Nov 2020 || 30 || align=left | Disc.: SDSSAdded on 17 January 2021 || 
|- id="2004 BR173" bgcolor=#E9E9E9
| 0 ||  || MBA-M || 18.4 || data-sort-value="0.88" | 880 m || multiple || 1998–2021 || 13 Feb 2021 || 38 || align=left | Disc.: SpacewatchAdded on 11 May 2021 || 
|- id="2004 BS173" bgcolor=#fefefe
| 1 ||  || MBA-I || 19.1 || data-sort-value="0.45" | 450 m || multiple || 2004–2021 || 19 Mar 2021 || 34 || align=left | Disc.: SpacewatchAdded on 11 May 2021 || 
|- id="2004 BT173" bgcolor=#fefefe
| 0 ||  || MBA-I || 19.36 || data-sort-value="0.40" | 400 m || multiple || 2004–2019 || 05 Nov 2019 || 26 || align=left | Disc.: SpacewatchAdded on 17 June 2021 || 
|- id="2004 BV173" bgcolor=#fefefe
| 0 ||  || MBA-I || 19.0 || data-sort-value="0.47" | 470 m || multiple || 2004–2021 || 10 Feb 2021 || 24 || align=left | Disc.: SpacewatchAdded on 5 November 2021 || 
|- id="2004 BW173" bgcolor=#d6d6d6
| 0 ||  || MBA-O || 17.4 || 1.8 km || multiple || 2004–2021 || 10 Apr 2021 || 24 || align=left | Disc.: SDSSAdded on 5 November 2021Alt.: 2010 MT134 || 
|- id="2004 BX173" bgcolor=#E9E9E9
| 0 ||  || MBA-M || 18.37 || 1.2 km || multiple || 2004–2021 || 08 Dec 2021 || 40 || align=left | Disc.: SpacewatchAdded on 24 December 2021 || 
|}
back to top

References 
 

Lists of unnumbered minor planets